= Bromo(tetrahydrothiophene)gold(I) =

Identifiers
CAS Number	39929-22-1
3D model (JSmol)	Interactive image
ChemSpider	57434281 erroneous
PubChem CID	85808834 PubChem in error
- InChI: InChI=1S/C4H8S.Au.BrH/c1-2-4-5-3-1;;/h1-4H2;;1H/q;+1;/p-1 Key: DVTPJQDAZYEPPF-UHFFFAOYSA-M
- SMILES: Br[Au-][S+]1CCCC1

Properties
Chemical formula	C_{4}H_{8}AuBrS
Molar mass	365.04 g·mol^{−1}

Related compounds
Related compounds	chloro(tetrahydrothiophene)gold(I), chloro(dimethyl sulfide)gold(I)
- Except where otherwise noted, data are given for materials in their standard state (at 25 °C [77 °F], 100 kPa). verify (what is ?) Infobox references

Bromo(tetrahydrothiophene)gold(I) is a coordination complex of gold. It is related to the more commonly used chloro(tetrahydrothiophene)gold(I). Similarly, the tetrahydrothiophene ligand is labile and is readily substituted with other stronger ligands, to give linear gold bromide complexes.

This compound may be prepared by reaction of tetrabromoauric acid (formed from tetrachloroauric acid and hydrobromic acid) with tetrahydrothiophene.
