= Chloro(dimethyl sulfide)gold(I) =

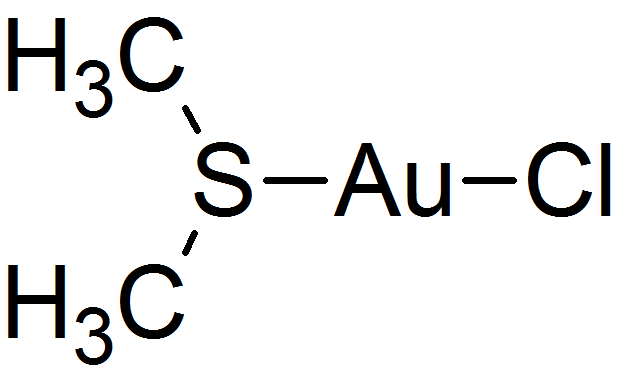

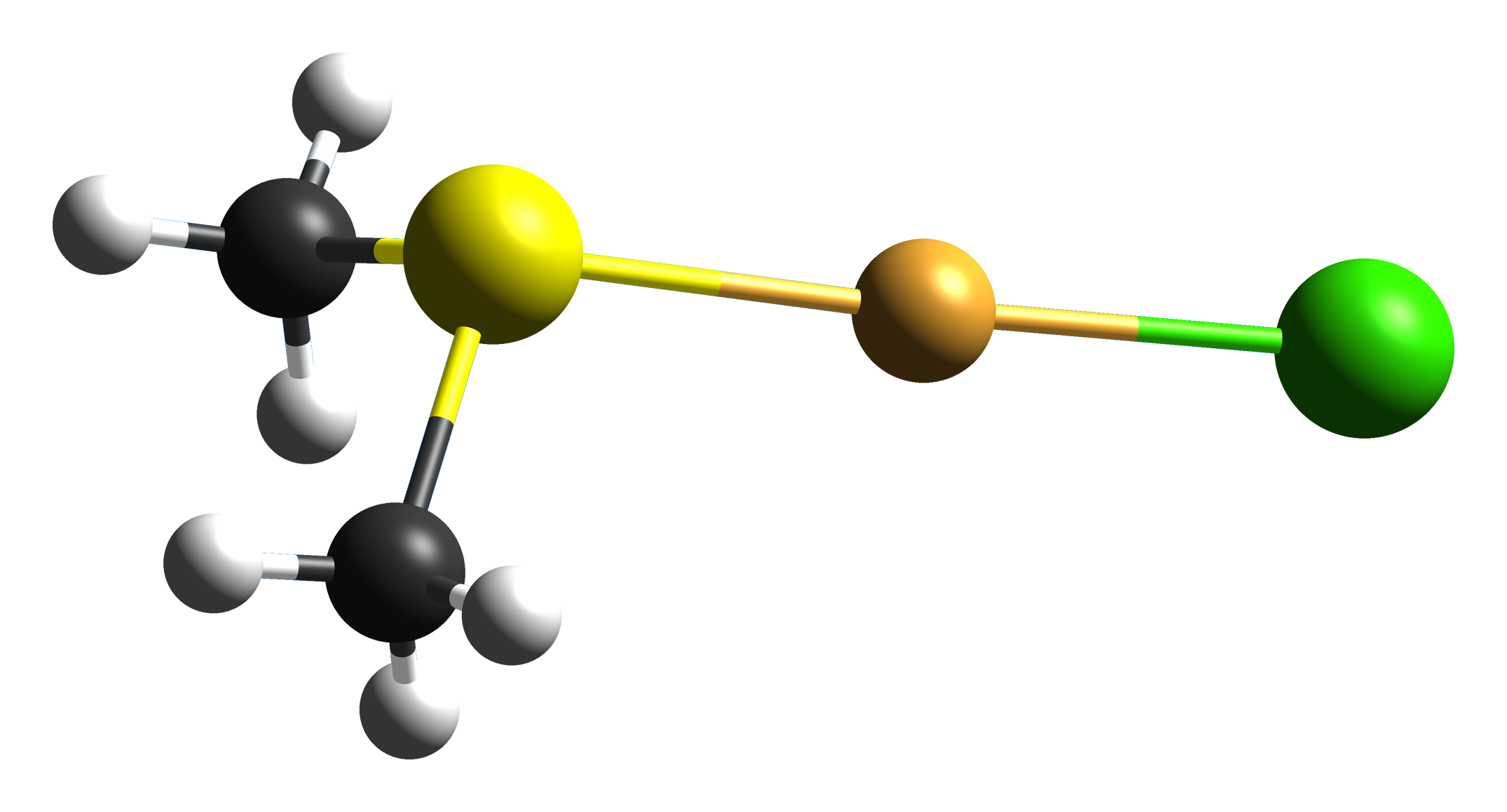

Identifiers
| CAS Number | 29892-37-3 |
| 3D model (JSmol) | separate form: Interactive image; coordination form: Interactive image |
| ChemSpider | 4809153 |
| ECHA InfoCard | 100.156.209 |
| PubChem CID | 6100873 |
| CompTox Dashboard (EPA) | DTXSID001029475 |
- InChI: InChI=1S/C2H6S.Au.ClH/c1-3-2;;/h1-2H3;;1H/q;+1;/p-1 Key: YQALRAGCVWJXGB-UHFFFAOYSA-M; InChI=1/C2H6S.Au.ClH/c1-3-2;;/h1-2H3;;1H/q;+1;/p-1 Key: YQALRAGCVWJXGB-REWHXWOFAH
- SMILES: separate form: [Au]Cl.CSC; coordination form: Cl[Au-][S+](C)C

Properties
| Chemical formula | C_{2}H_{6}AuClS |
| Molar mass | 294.55 g·mol^{−1} |

Hazards
- GHS labelling
| Pictograms | (GHS07: Exclamation mark) |
| Signal word | Warning |
| Hazard statements | H315, H319, H335 |
| Precautionary statements | P261, P264, P271, P280, P302+P352, P304+P340, P305+P351+P338, P312, P321, P332+P313, P337+P313, P362, P403+P233, P405, P501 |

Related compounds
| Related compounds | chloro(tetrahydrothiophene)gold(I) |
- Except where otherwise noted, data are given for materials in their standard state (at 25 °C [77 °F], 100 kPa). verify (what is ?) Infobox references

Chloro(dimethyl sulfide)gold(I) is a coordination complex of gold. It is a white solid. This compound is a common entry point into gold chemistry.

== Structure ==
As for many other gold(I) complexes, the compound adopts a nearly linear (176.9°) geometry about the central gold atom. The Au-S bond distance is 2.271(2) Å, which is similar to other gold(I)-sulfur bonds.

== Preparation ==
Chloro(dimethyl sulfide)gold(I) is commercially available. It may be prepared by dissolving gold in aqua regia (to give chloroauric acid), followed by addition of dimethyl sulfide. Alternatively, sodium tetrachloroaurate may be used as the source of gold(III). The bromo analog, Me_{2}SAuBr, has also been synthesized by a similar route. An approximate equation is:

HAuCl_{4} + 2 SMe_{2} + H_{2}O → Me_{2}SAuCl + 3 HCl + OSMe_{2}

A simple preparation starts from elemental gold in DMSO / conc HCl (1:2) where DMSO acts as an oxidant and the formed Me_{2}S as ligand. As a side product, HAuCl_{4}·2DMSO is formed.

== Reactions ==
In chloro(dimethyl sulfide)gold(I), the dimethyl sulfide ligand is easily displaced by other ligands:

Me_{2}SAuCl + L → LAuCl + Me_{2}S (L = ligand)

Since Me_{2}S is volatile, the new complex LAuCl is often easily purified.

When exposed to light, heat, or air, the compound decomposes to elemental gold.
