= Cuítiva =

Coordinates: 5°35′N 72°58′W

- Municipality and town
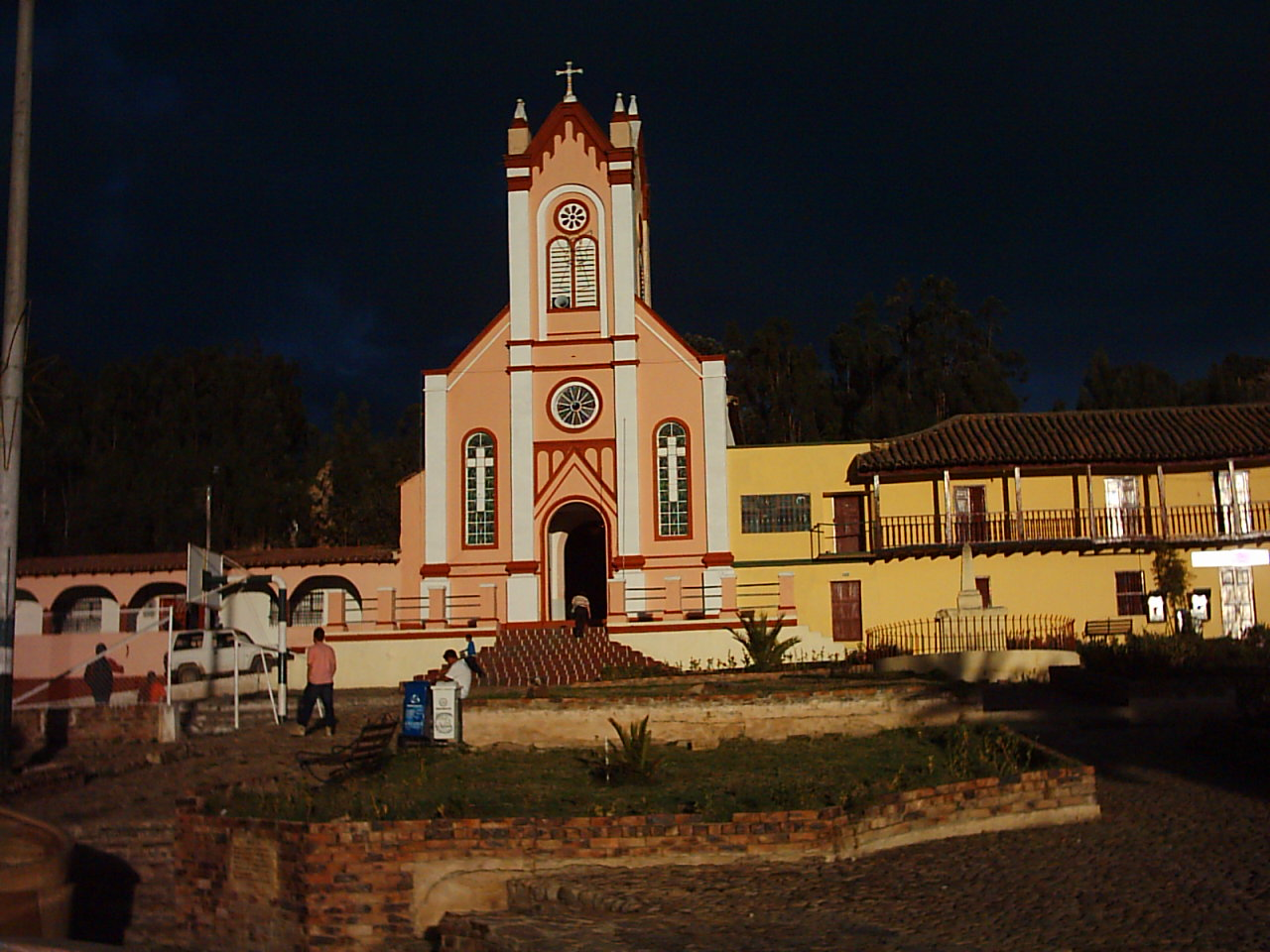
- Church of Cuítiva

- Flag

- Location of the municipality and town of Cuítiva in the Boyacá Department of Colombia
- Country: Colombia
- Department: Boyacá Department
- Province: Sugamuxi Province
- Founded: 19 January 1550
- Founder: Juan de San Martín

Government
  - Mayor: Segundo Aldemar Toca Suárez (2020-2023)

Area
  - Municipality and town: 43 km^{2} (17 sq mi)
  - Urban: 3.6 km^{2} (1.4 sq mi)
- Elevation: 2,750 m (9,020 ft)

Population (2015)
  - Municipality and town: 1,906
  - Density: 44/km^{2} (110/sq mi)
  - Urban: 218
- Time zone: UTC-5 (Colombia Standard Time)
- Website: Official website

Cuítiva is a town and municipality in the Sugamuxi Province, part of the Colombian department of Boyacá. The urban centre is situated on the Altiplano Cundiboyacense at an altitude of 2,750 metres (9,020 ft) and a distance of 85 kilometres (53 mi) from the department capital Tunja. The altitudes of the municipality range from 2,727 metres (8,947 ft) to 3,200 metres (10,500 ft) and it borders Iza in the north, Sogamoso in the east, Aquitania in the west and Tota in the south.

== Etymology ==
The name Cuítiva is derived from Muysccubun and means "Similarity to the chief".

== History ==
The area of Cuítiva before the Spanish conquest was inhabited by the Muisca, organized in their loose Muisca Confederation. Nearby iraca of Sugamuxi ruled over Cuítiva.

Modern Cuítiva was founded by Juan de San Martín on January 19, 1550.

On the central square a monument honouring messenger god in the religion of the Muisca; Bochica has been erected.

== Economy ==
Main economical activities of Cuítiva are agriculture; potatoes, peas, wheat, maize and Welsh onions and livestock farming.

== Climate ==
Climate data for Cuítiva (Tunel El), elevation 3,000 m (9,800 ft), (1981–2010)
Month	Jan	Feb	Mar	Apr	May	Jun	Jul	Aug	Sep	Oct	Nov	Dec	Year
Mean daily maximum °C (°F)	16.9 (62.4)	16.8 (62.2)	17.0 (62.6)	16.3 (61.3)	15.8 (60.4)	14.9 (58.8)	14.5 (58.1)	14.5 (58.1)	15.2 (59.4)	15.7 (60.3)	16.1 (61.0)	16.6 (61.9)	15.8 (60.4)
Daily mean °C (°F)	11.6 (52.9)	11.7 (53.1)	11.8 (53.2)	11.8 (53.2)	11.8 (53.2)	11.4 (52.5)	10.9 (51.6)	10.9 (51.6)	11.2 (52.2)	11.4 (52.5)	11.6 (52.9)	11.8 (53.2)	11.5 (52.7)
Mean daily minimum °C (°F)	6.8 (44.2)	7.3 (45.1)	7.6 (45.7)	8.2 (46.8)	8.5 (47.3)	8.2 (46.8)	7.7 (45.9)	7.7 (45.9)	7.5 (45.5)	7.6 (45.7)	7.9 (46.2)	7.4 (45.3)	7.7 (45.9)
Average precipitation mm (inches)	17.1 (0.67)	30.4 (1.20)	57.2 (2.25)	95.7 (3.77)	87.8 (3.46)	70.1 (2.76)	77.9 (3.07)	58.8 (2.31)	62.5 (2.46)	87.2 (3.43)	81.4 (3.20)	23.9 (0.94)	749.9 (29.52)
Average precipitation days	4	6	11	15	18	18	20	18	16	16	14	8	159
Average relative humidity (%)	80	81	82	85	85	85	85	85	84	85	85	82	84
Mean monthly sunshine hours	241.8	183.5	167.4	132.0	139.5	129.0	139.5	130.2	132.0	145.7	156.0	213.9	1,910.5
Mean daily sunshine hours	7.8	6.5	5.4	4.4	4.5	4.3	4.5	4.2	4.4	4.7	5.2	6.9	5.2
Source: Instituto de Hidrologia Meteorologia y Estudios Ambientales

== Gallery ==
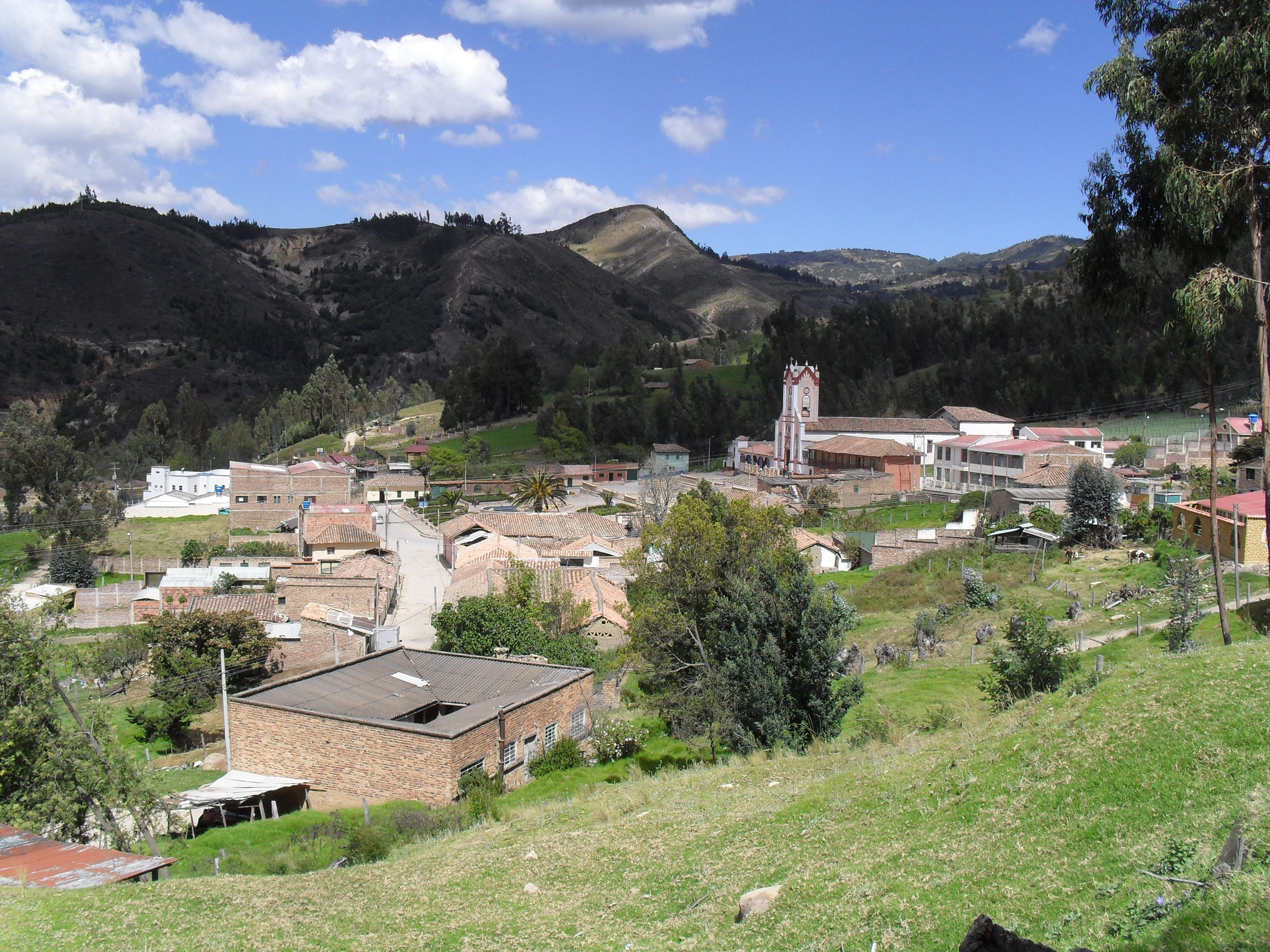
View of Cuítiva

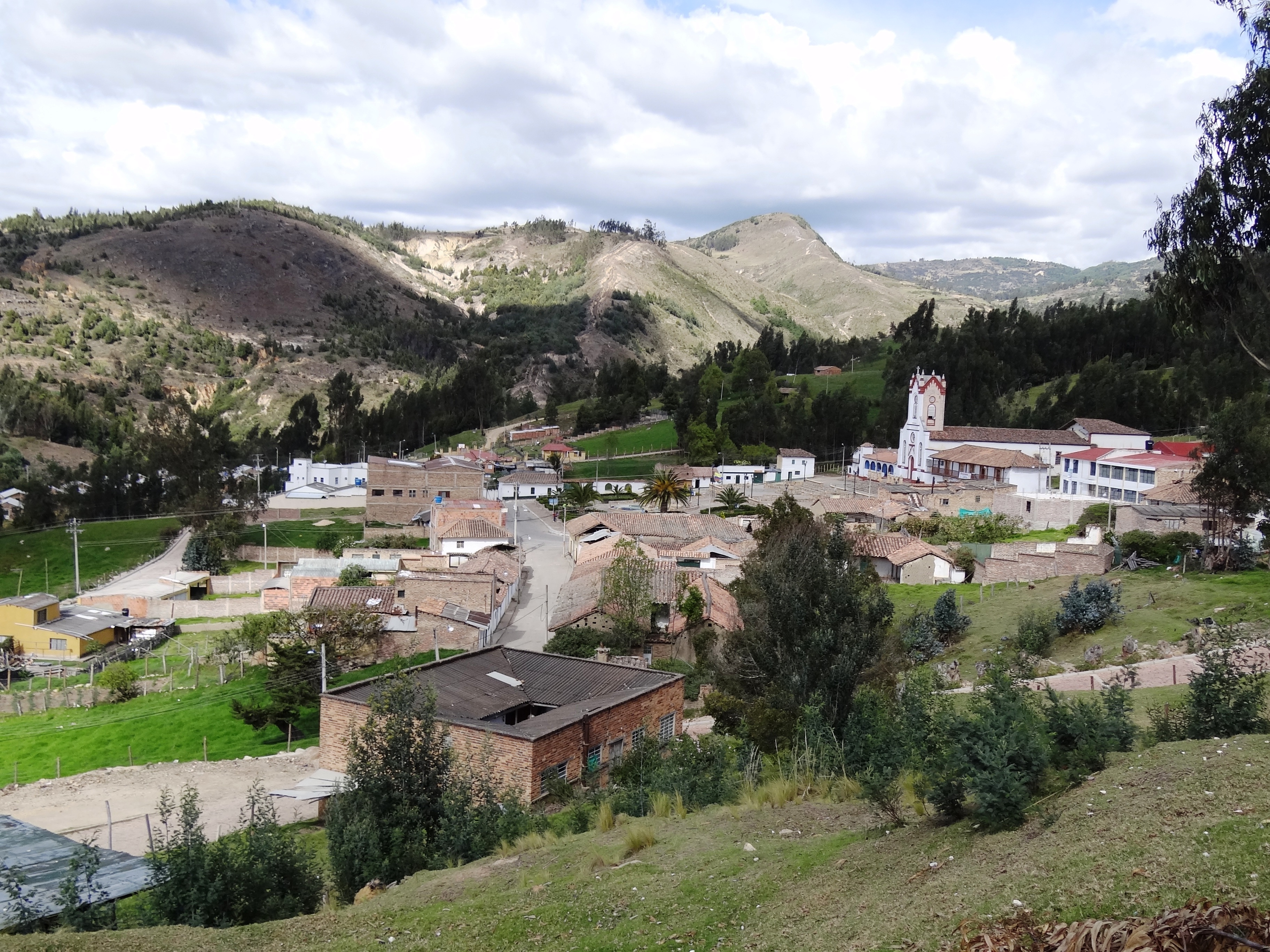
View of urban centre

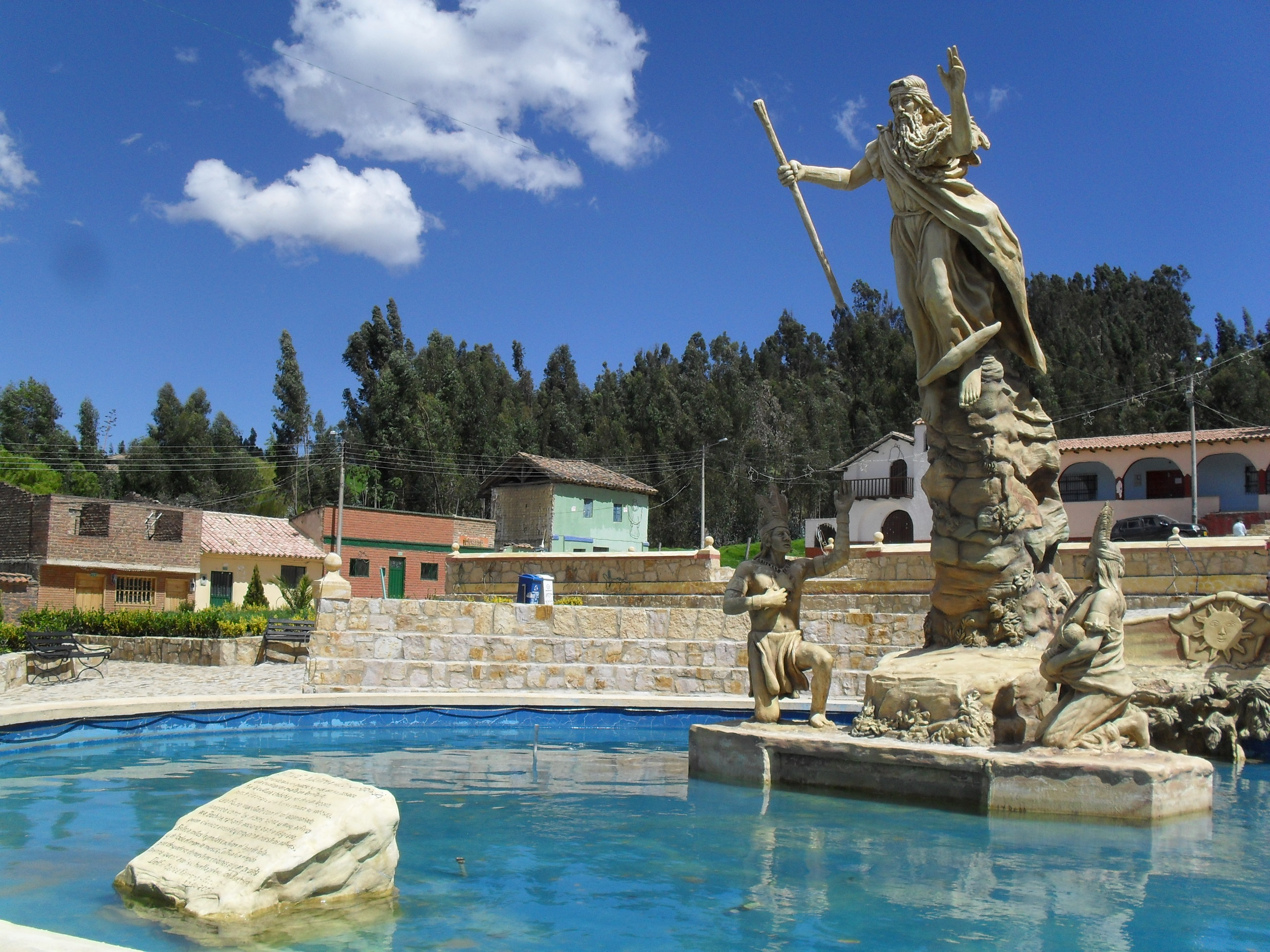
Monument to Bochica

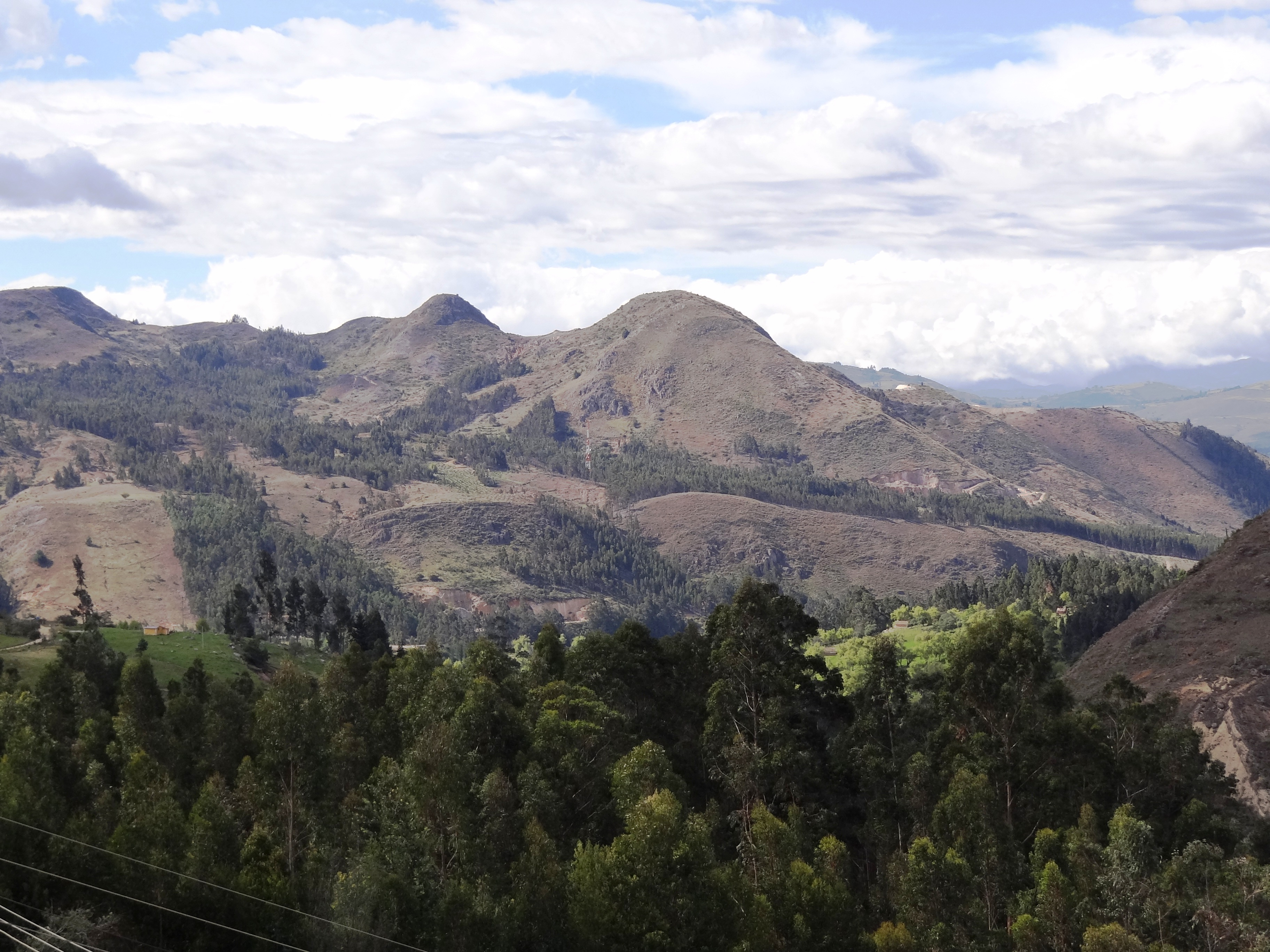
Rural area
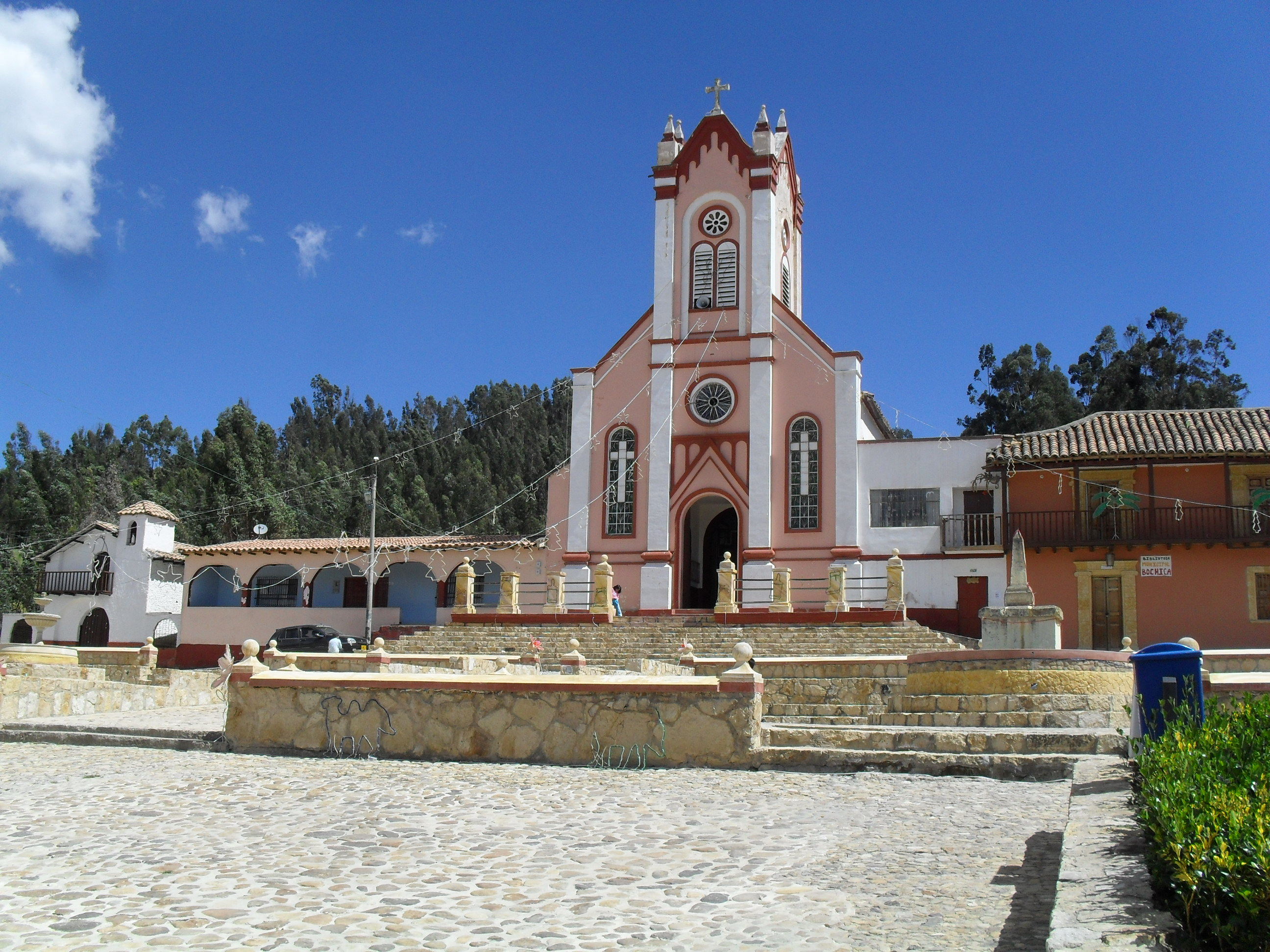
Church of Cuítiva

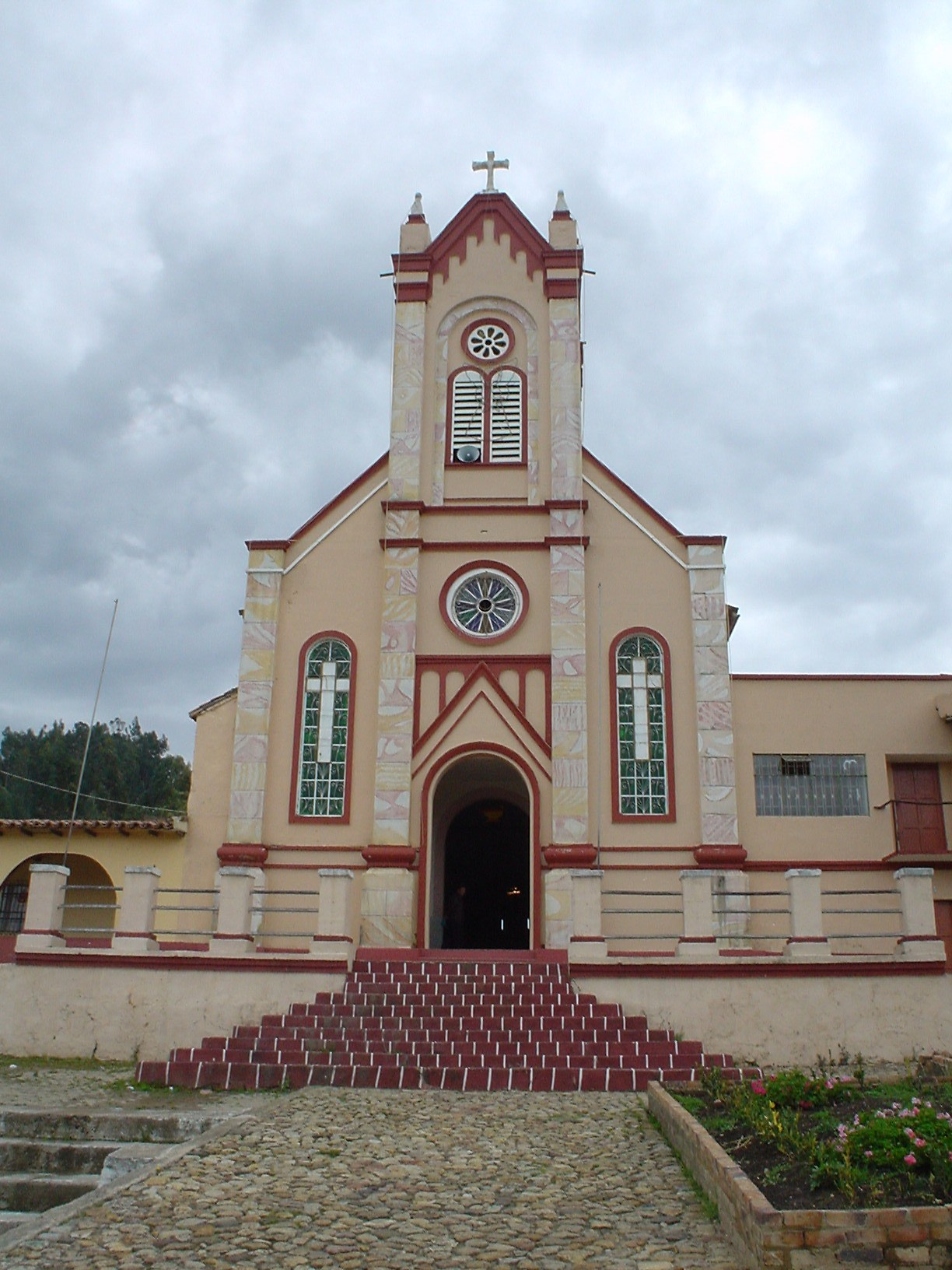
Church

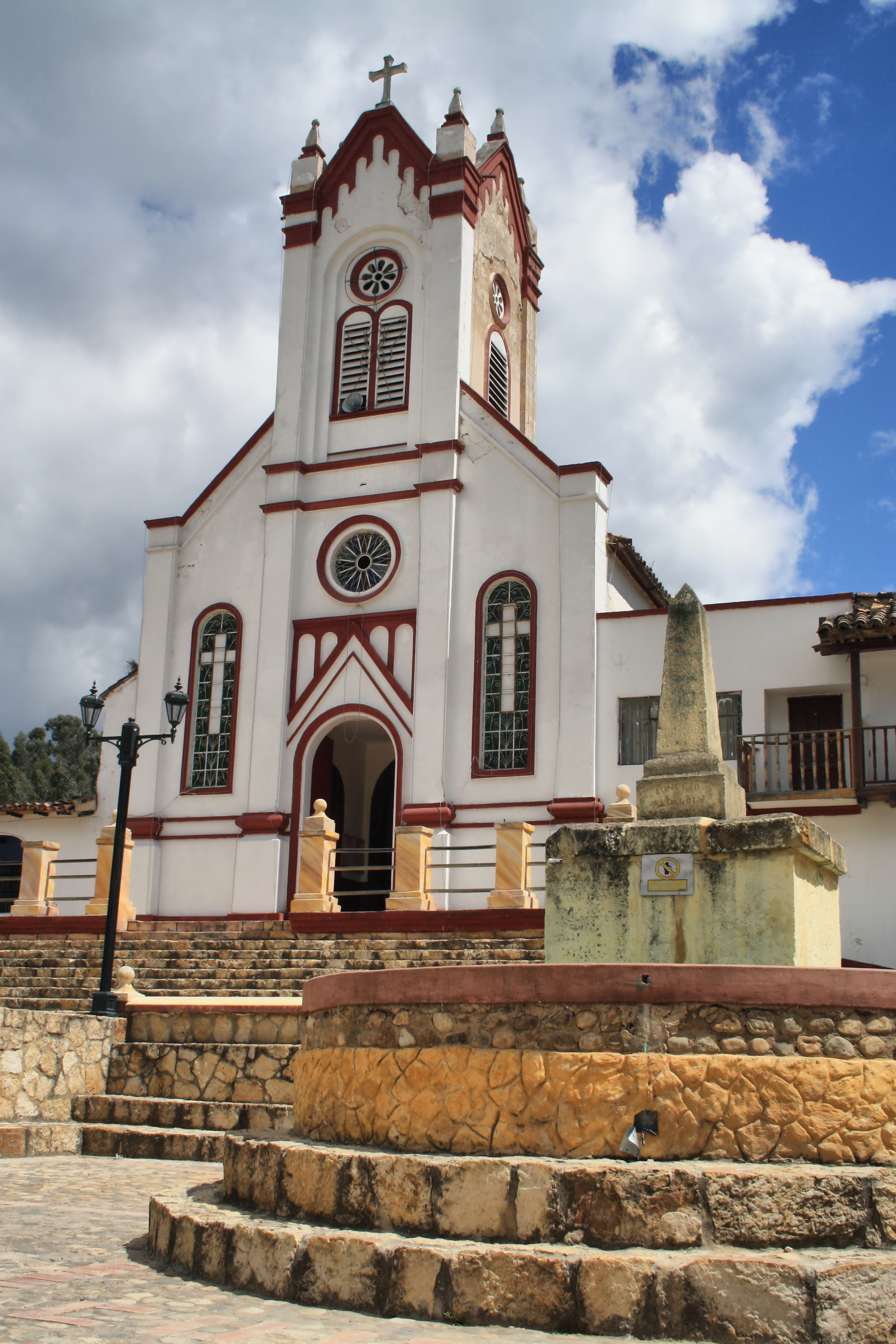
Church

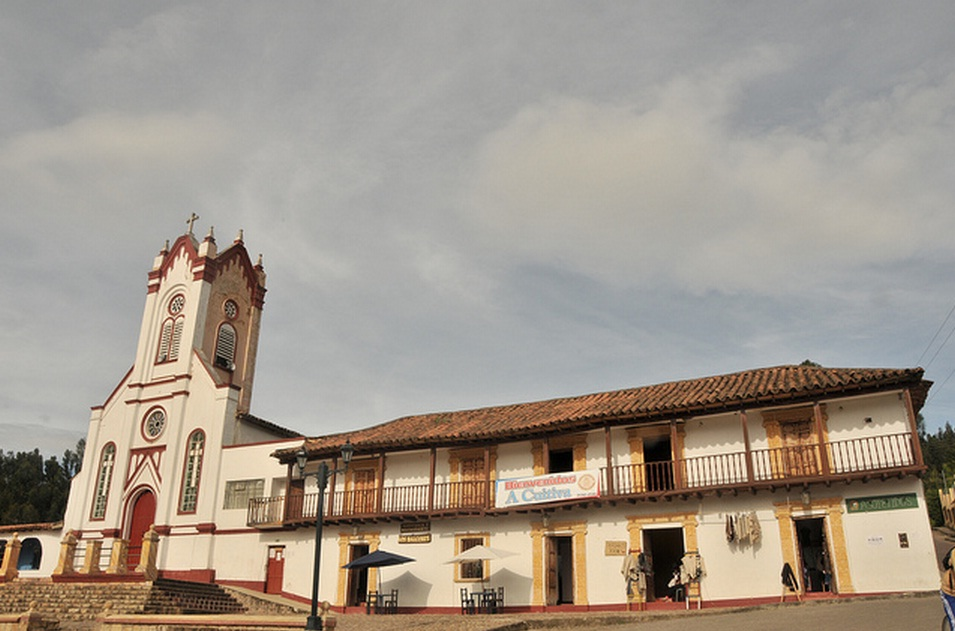
Church
