= Chloro(tetrahydrothiophene)gold(I) =

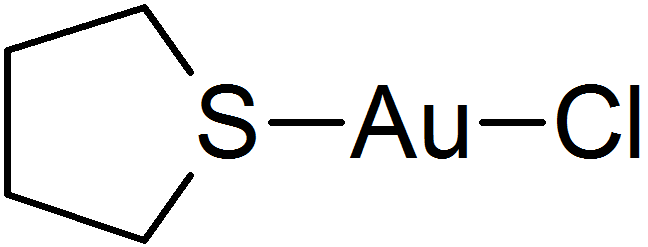

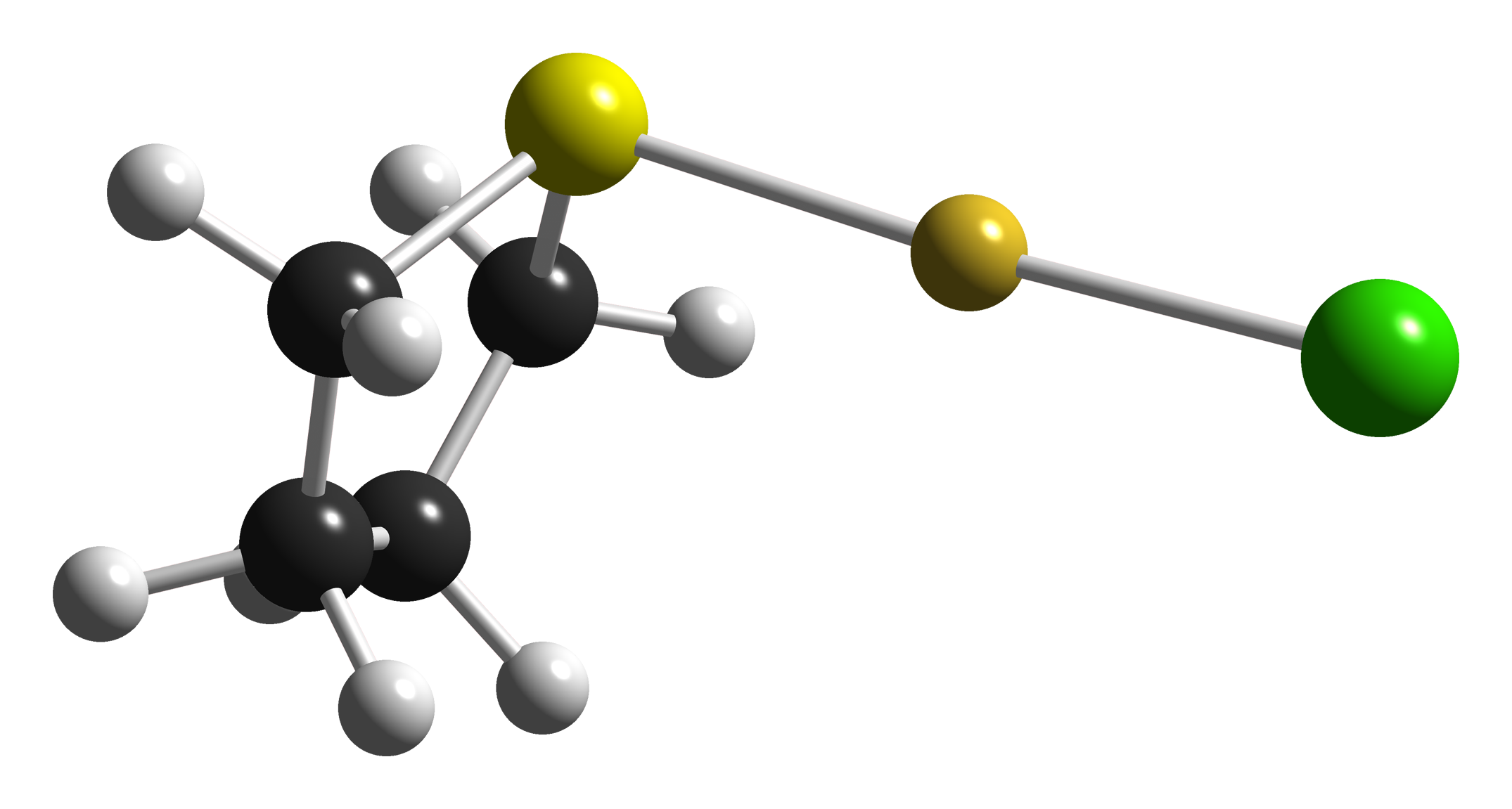

Identifiers
CAS Number	39929-21-0
3D model (JSmol)	Interactive image
ChemSpider	9956880
PubChem CID	11782199
- InChI: InChI=1S/C4H8S.Au.ClH/c1-2-4-5-3-1;;/h1-4H2;;1H/q;+1;/p-1 Key: UCGCVRKULHHWGA-UHFFFAOYSA-M
- SMILES: C1CCSC1.Cl[Au]

Properties
Chemical formula	C_{4}H_{8}AuClS
Molar mass	320.58 g·mol^{−1}
Appearance	White to off-white powder

Structure
Crystal structure	orthorhombic
Space group	Pmc2_{1}, No. 26
Lattice constant	a = 6.540(1) Å, b = 8.192(1) Å, c = 12.794(3) Å
Formula units (Z)	4

Related compounds
Related compounds	chloro(dimethyl sulfide)gold(I), bromo(tetrahydrothiophene)gold(I)
- Except where otherwise noted, data are given for materials in their standard state (at 25 °C [77 °F], 100 kPa). verify (what is ?) Infobox references

Chloro(tetrahydrothiophene)gold(I), abbreviated (tht)AuCl, is a coordination complex of gold. Like the dimethyl sulfide analog, this compound is used as an entry point to gold chemistry. The tetrahydrothiophene ligand is labile and is readily substituted with other stronger ligands.

== Preparation ==
This compound may be prepared by the reduction of tetrachloroauric acid with tetrahydrothiophene:

HAuCl_{4} + 2 SC_{4}H_{8} + H_{2}O → AuCl(SC_{4}H_{8}) + OSC_{4}H_{8} + 3 HCl

The complex adopts a linear coordination geometry, as is typical of many gold(I) compounds. It crystallizes in the orthorhombic space group Pmc2_{1} with a = 6.540(1) Å, b = 8.192(1) Å, c = 12.794(3) Å with Z = 4 formula units per unit cell. The bromide congener is isostructural.

It is somewhat less thermally labile compared to (Me_{2}S)AuCl, but is still sensitive to temperature and light.
