= Negimaki =

Japanese-American beef dish

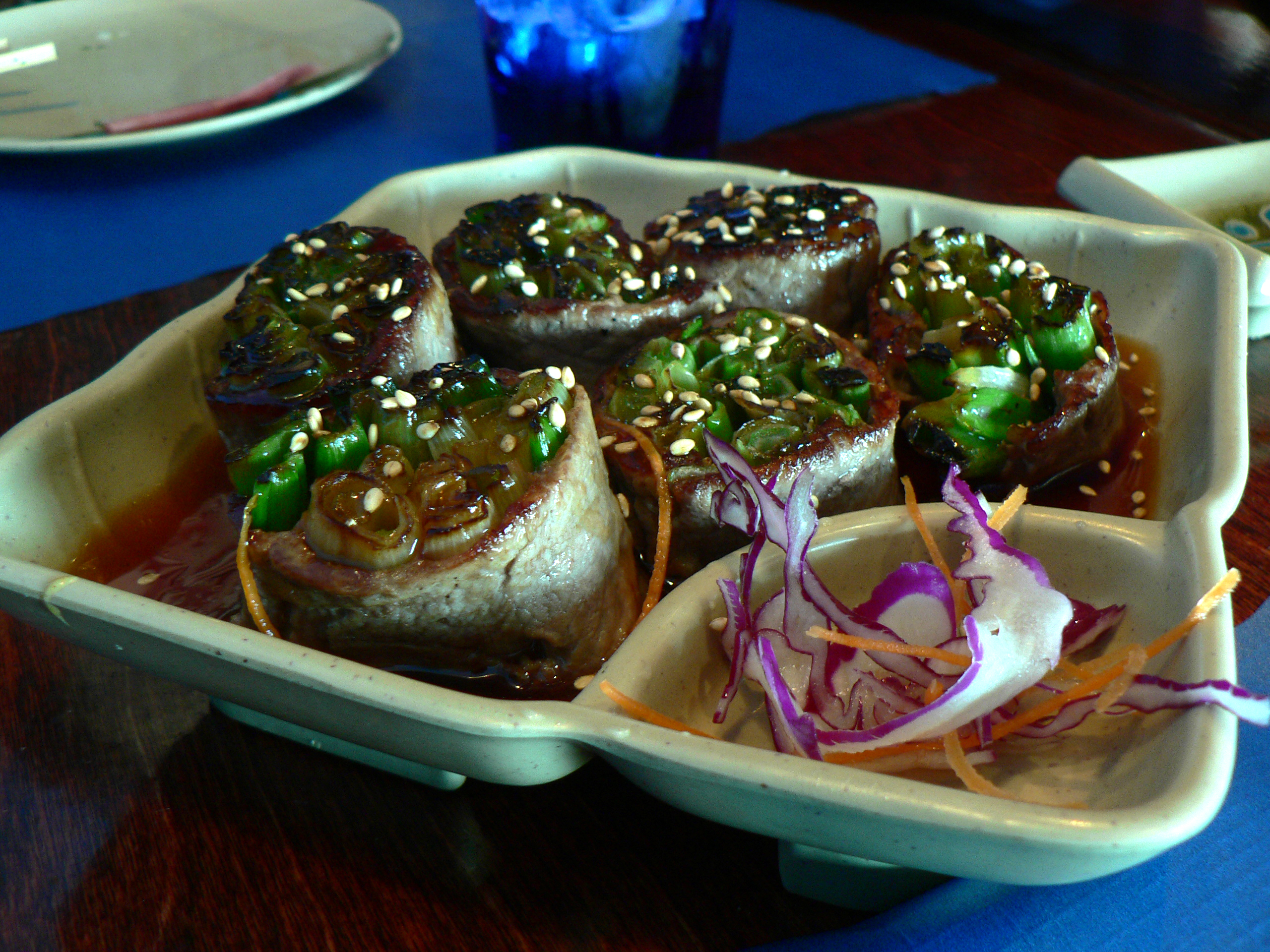
Negimaki

Negimaki (ねぎ巻き) is a Japanese American food consisting of broiled strips of meat marinated in teriyaki sauce and rolled with scallions (negi). Originally beef was used, but negimaki are also commonly made with other meat such as chicken.

== History ==
The dish originated in Manhattan in the 1960s at Restaurant Nippon after the New York Times food critic Craig Claiborne suggested that something with beef was needed to appeal to the American diner. According to the dish's inventor, Nobuyoshi Kuraoka, it was a variation of a dish traditionally made with bluefin tuna.
