= Tetrahydrothiophene =

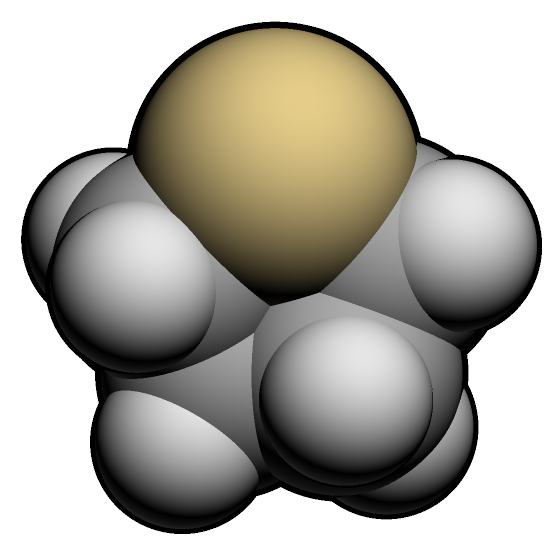

Names
- Preferred IUPAC name Thiolane
- Other names Tetrahydrothiophene, thiophane, tetramethylene sulfide

Identifiers
CAS Number	110-01-0
3D model (JSmol)	Interactive image
Abbreviations	THT
Beilstein Reference	102392
ChEBI	CHEBI:48458
ChEMBL	ChEMBL1379
ChemSpider	1095
ECHA InfoCard	100.003.391
EC Number	203-728-9
PubChem CID	1127
RTECS number	XN0370000
UNII	744EHT13FM
UN number	2412
CompTox Dashboard (EPA)	DTXSID3047760
- InChI: InChI=1S/C4H8S/c1-2-4-5-3-1/h1-4H2 Key: RAOIDOHSFRTOEL-UHFFFAOYSA-N; InChI=1/C4H8S/c1-2-4-5-3-1/h1-4H2 Key: RAOIDOHSFRTOEL-UHFFFAOYAY
- SMILES: S1CCCC1

Properties
Chemical formula	C_{4}H_{8}S
Molar mass	88.17 g·mol^{−1}
Appearance	colorless liquid
Density	0.997 g/mL
Melting point	−96 °C (−141 °F; 177 K)
Boiling point	119 °C (246 °F; 392 K)

Hazards
- Occupational safety and health (OHS/OSH)
Main hazards	Stench, flammable, irritant
- GHS labelling
Pictograms	(GHS02: Flammable) (GHS07: Exclamation mark)
Signal word	Danger
Hazard statements	H225, H302, H312, H315, H319, H332, H412
Precautionary statements	P210, P233, P240, P241, P242, P243, P261, P264, P270, P271, P273, P280, P301+P312, P302+P352, P303+P361+P353, P304+P312, P304+P340, P305+P351+P338, P312, P321, P322, P330, P332+P313, P337+P313, P362, P363, P370+P378, P403+P235, P501
Flash point	12 °C (54 °F; 285 K)
Autoignition temperature	200 °C (392 °F; 473 K)
Safety data sheet (SDS)	Oakwood

Related compounds
Related compounds	Tetrahydrofuran, Thiophene, Selenolane, Thiazolidine, Dithiolane, Thiane
- Except where otherwise noted, data are given for materials in their standard state (at 25 °C [77 °F], 100 kPa). verify (what is ?) Infobox references

Tetrahydrothiophene is an organosulfur compound with the formula (CH_{2})_{4}S. The molecule consists of a five-membered saturated ring with four methylene groups and a sulfur atom. It is the saturated analog of thiophene and is therefore the sulfur analog of THF. It is a volatile, colorless liquid with an intensely unpleasant odor. It is also known as thiophane, thiolane, or THT.

== Synthesis and reactions ==
Tetrahydrothiophene is prepared by the reaction of tetrahydrofuran with hydrogen sulfide. This vapor-phase reaction is catalyzed by alumina and other heterogenous acid catalysts.

This compound is a ligand in coordination chemistry, an example being the complex chloro(tetrahydrothiophene)gold(I).

Oxidation of THT gives the sulfone sulfolane, which is of interest as a polar, odorless solvent:

C_{4}H_{8}S + 2 O → C_{4}H_{8}SO_{2}

Sulfolane is, however, more conventionally prepared from butadiene.

== Natural occurrence ==
Both unsubstituted and substituted tetrahydrothiophenes are reported to occur in nature. For example, tetrahydrothiophene occurs as a volatile from Eruca sativa Mill. (salad rocket) while monocyclic substituted tetrahydrothiophenes have been isolated from Allium fistulosum 'Kujou', Allium sativum (garlic), Allium cepa (onion), Allium schoenoprasum (chives), and Salacia prinoides. Albomycins are a group of tetrahydrothiophene-ring containing antibiotics from streptomyces while biotin and neothiobinupharidine (and other nuphar alkaloids), are examples of bicyclic and polycyclic tetrahydrothiophene-ring containing natural products, respectively.

== Applications ==
Because of its smell, tetrahydrothiophene has been used as an odorant in LPG, albeit no longer in North America. It is also used as an odorant for natural gas, usually in mixtures containing tert-butylthiol.

Tetrahydrothiophene is a Lewis base classified as a soft base and its donor properties are discussed in the ECW model.

== See also ==
- Tetrahydrofuran
- Thiophene
