= Tetrabromoauric acid =

Names
- Other names Tetrabromoauric(III) acid Hydrogen tetrabromoaurate(III)

Identifiers
CAS Number	17083-68-0
3D model (JSmol)	Interactive image
ChemSpider	23350057
ECHA InfoCard	100.037.385
EC Number	241-139-9
PubChem CID	18674916
UNII	9LR3TA4DGO
CompTox Dashboard (EPA)	DTXSID601015044 DTXSID90276474, DTXSID601015044
- InChI: InChI=1S/Au.4BrH/h;4*1H/q+3;;;;/p-3 Key: ISCGOTZIVSCDBJ-UHFFFAOYSA-K
- SMILES: [H+].Br[Au-](Br)(Br)Br

Properties
Chemical formula	H[AuBr_{4}]
Molar mass	517.591 g·mol^{−1}
Conjugate base	Tetrabromoaurate(III)
- Except where otherwise noted, data are given for materials in their standard state (at 25 °C [77 °F], 100 kPa). verify (what is ?) Infobox references

Tetrabromoauric acid is an inorganic compound with the formula H[AuBr_{4}]. It is the bromide analog of chloroauric acid. It is generated analogously, by reacting a mixture of hydrobromic and nitric acids with elemental gold. The oxidation state of gold in H[AuBr_{4}] and [AuBr_{4}]^{−} anion is +3. The salts of H[AuBr_{4}] (tetrabromoauric(III) acid) are tetrabromoaurates(III), containing [AuBr_{4}]^{−} anions (tetrabromoaurate(III) anions), which have square planar molecular geometry.
