= Sodium tetrachloroaurate =

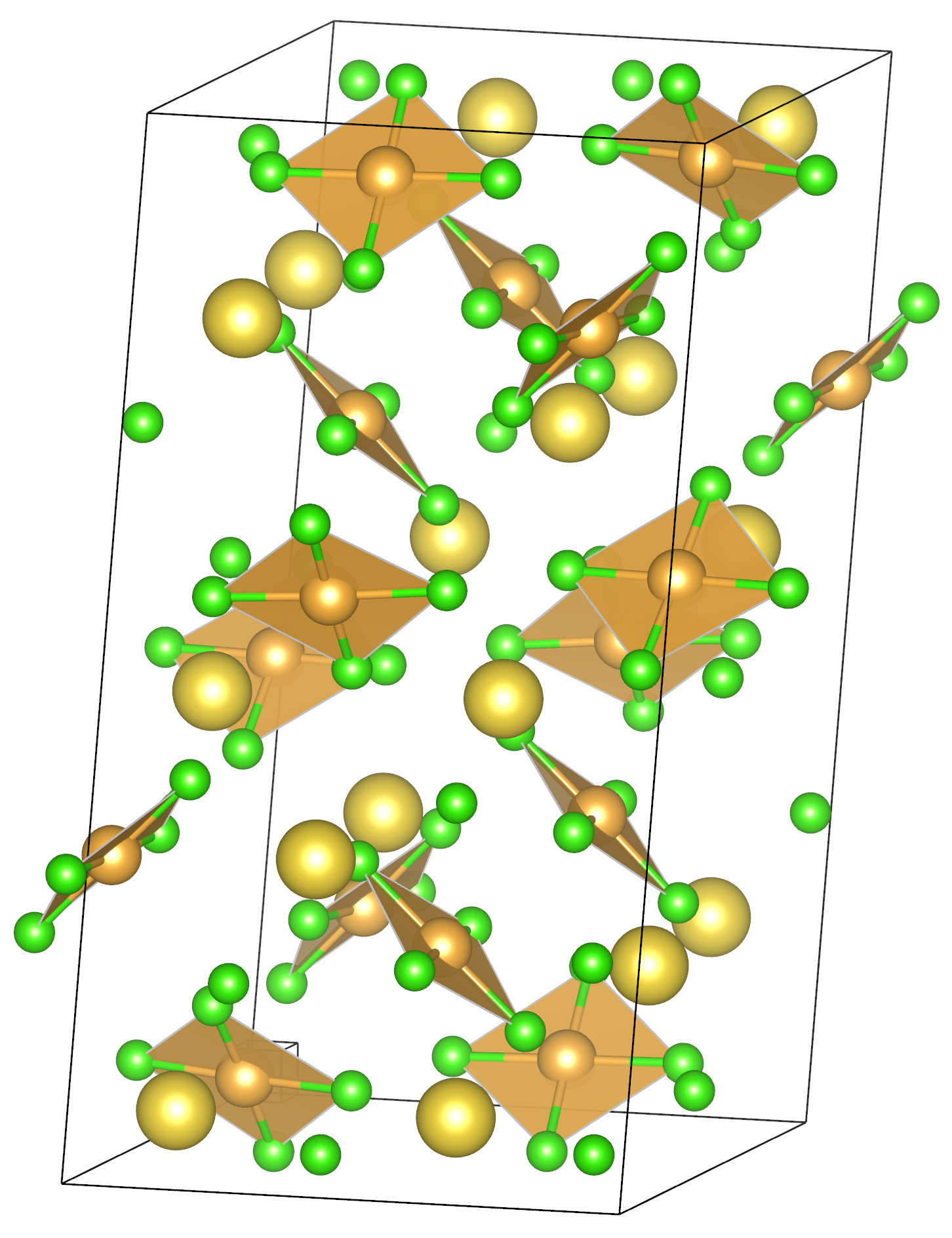
- __ Na^{+} __ Au^{3+} __ Cl^{−}

Names
- IUPAC name Sodium tetrachloroaurate(III)
- Other names Sodium gold chloride, yellow gold chloride

Identifiers
CAS Number	15189-51-2 (anhydrous); 13874-02-7 (dihydrate)
3D model (JSmol)	Interactive image
ChemSpider	25247
ECHA InfoCard	100.035.659
EC Number	239-241-3
PubChem CID	27127
UNII	7FT6QUT299
CompTox Dashboard (EPA)	DTXSID20934358
- InChI: InChI=1S/Au.4ClH.Na/h;4*1H;/q+3;;;;;+1/p-4
- SMILES: [Na+].Cl[Au-](Cl)(Cl)Cl

Properties
Chemical formula	NaAuCl_{4}
Molar mass	361.756 g/mol
Appearance	Orange powder
Density	3.81 g cm^{−3}
Solubility in water	anhydrous: 139g/100ml (10°C) 151g/100ml (20°C) 900g/100ml (60°C)
Solubility	Sparingly soluble in diethyl ether, soluble in alcohol, ether

Hazards
- GHS labelling
Pictograms	(GHS05: Corrosive) (GHS07: Exclamation mark)
Signal word	Danger
Hazard statements	H315, H319, H335
Precautionary statements	P261, P264, P271, P280, P302+P352, P304+P340, P305+P351+P338, P312, P330, P332+P313, P333+P313, P337+P313, P363, P403+P233, P405, P501
- Except where otherwise noted, data are given for materials in their standard state (at 25 °C [77 °F], 100 kPa). Infobox references

Sodium tetrachloroaurate is an inorganic compound with the chemical formula NaAuCl_{4}. It is composed of the Na^{+} and AuCl_{4}^{−} ions. It exists in the anhydrous and dihydrate states. At room temperature, it exists as a golden-orange solid. The anhydrous and dihydrate forms are available commercially.

== Preparation ==
The conventional method of preparation of sodium tetrachloroaurate involves the addition of tetrachloroauric acid solution to sodium chloride or sodium carbonate to form a mixture. The mixture is stirred at 100 °C, and then subjected to evaporation, cooling, crystallization, and drying to obtain the orange crystals of sodium tetrachloroaurate.

H[AuCl_{4}] + NaCl → Na[AuCl_{4}] + HCl

2 H[AuCl_{4}] + Na_{2}CO_{3} → 2 Na[AuCl_{4}] + H_{2}O + CO_{2}

However, more efficient preparation methods have been discovered recently. These are the addition of gold with sodium oxy-halogen salts and hydrochloric acid.

== Uses ==
It is used in a wide range of applications. For example, it is used as a catalyst for the hydrochlorination of acetylene, or the oxidation of sulfides.
