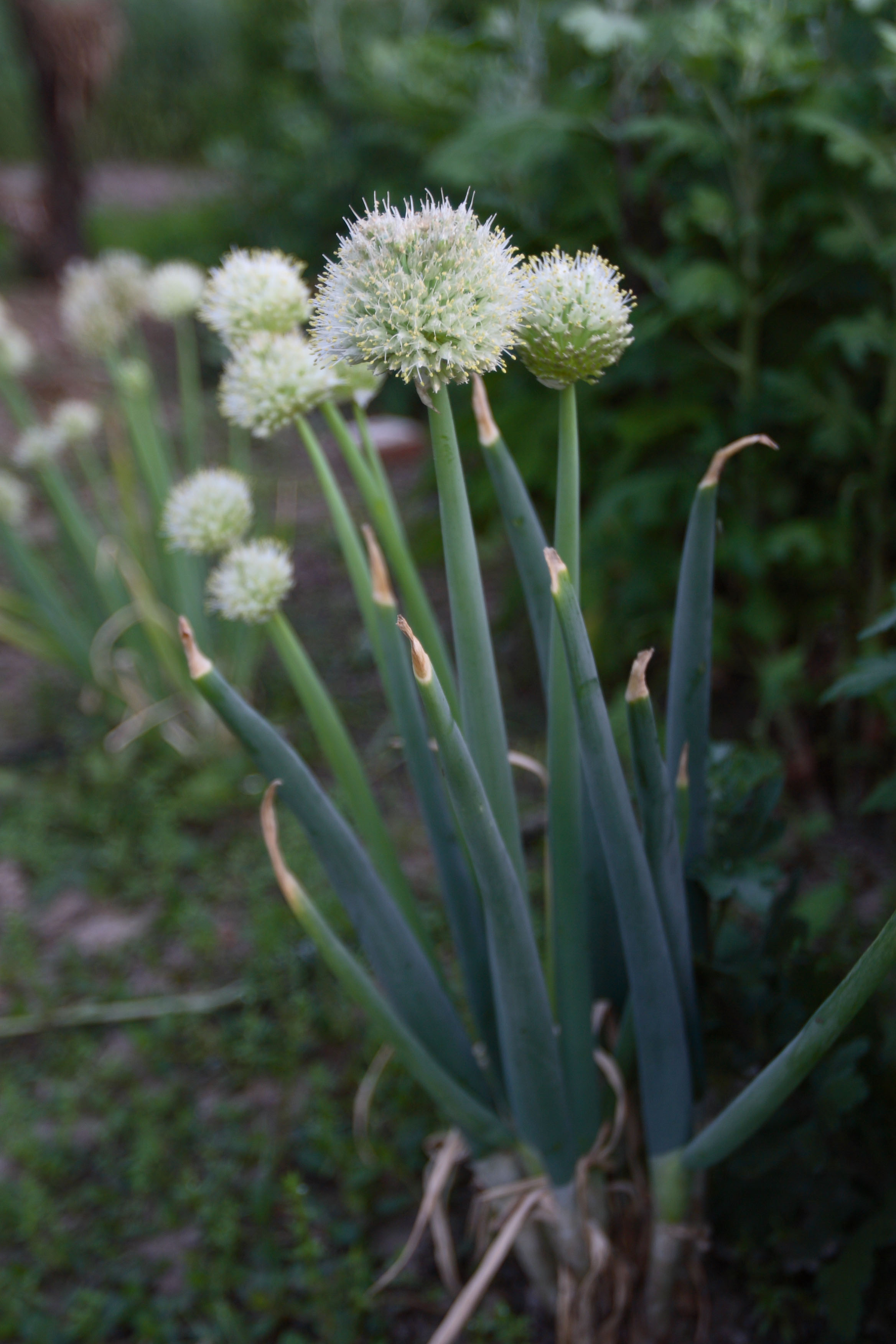
- Allium fistulosum at a farm
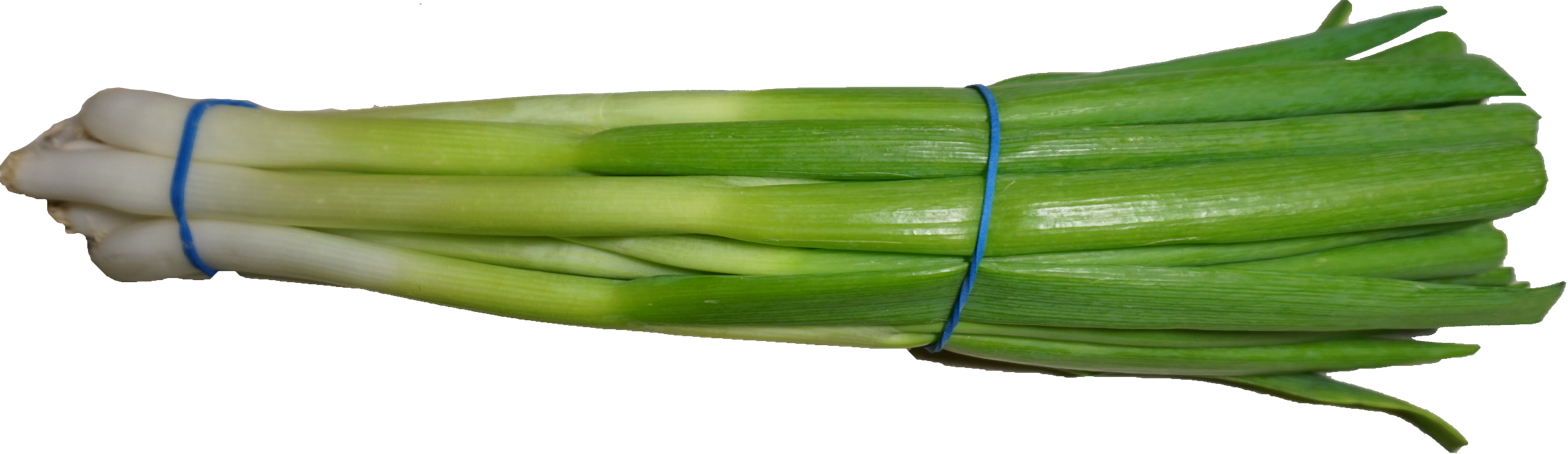
- Allium fistulosum from a store

Scientific classification
- Kingdom: Plantae
- Clade: Tracheophytes
- Clade: Angiosperms
- Clade: Monocots
- Order: Asparagales
- Family: Amaryllidaceae
- Subfamily: Allioideae
- Genus: Allium
- Subgenus: A. subg. Cepa
- Species: A. fistulosum

Binomial name
- Allium fistulosum L.

Synonyms
- List: Allium bouddae Debeaux; Allium kashgaricum Prokh.; Cepa fissilis Garsault; Cepa fistulosa (L.) Gray; Cepa ventricosa Moench; Kepa fistulosa (L.) Raf.; Phyllodolon fistulosum (L.) Salisb.; Porrum fistulosum (L.) Schur

= Allium fistulosum =

Welsh onion

Species of plant

Allium fistulosum, the Welsh onion, also commonly called Japanese bunching onion, stone-leek, and spring onion, is a species of perennial plant, often considered to be a kind of scallion.

A. fistulosum forms perennial evergreen clumps of tubular leaves up to 0.6 metres (2 feet) tall, topped by white umbels. It is commonly used in Asian cuisine.

== Names ==
The common name "Welsh onion" does not refer to Wales; indeed, the plant is neither indigenous to Wales nor particularly common in Welsh cuisine. (The green Allium common to Wales is the leek, A. ampeloprasum, the national vegetable of Wales.) Instead, it derives from a near-obsolete botanical use of Welsh in the sense 'foreign, non-native' because the species is native to China.

Historically, A. fistulosum was known as the cibol. In Cornwall, they are known as chibols, and in Scotland as sybows or sybies.

The plant may also be called stone-leek or rock onion. Other names that may be applied to this plant include Japanese bunching onion, green onion, salad onion, and spring onion. These names are ambiguous, as they may also be used to refer to any young green onion stalk, whether grown from Welsh onions, common onions, or other similar members of the genus Allium (e.g. the scallion).

== Description ==
Growing from elongate bulbs (sometimes described as not a bulb at all), the plant forms perennial evergreen clumps up to 0.6 metres (2 feet) tall and 0.3 m (1 ft) wide, with tubelike leaves. Blooming from late May to August, the inflorescence is a greenish white umbel 2.5–7.5 centimetres (1–3 inches) in width, containing 50–100 flowers.

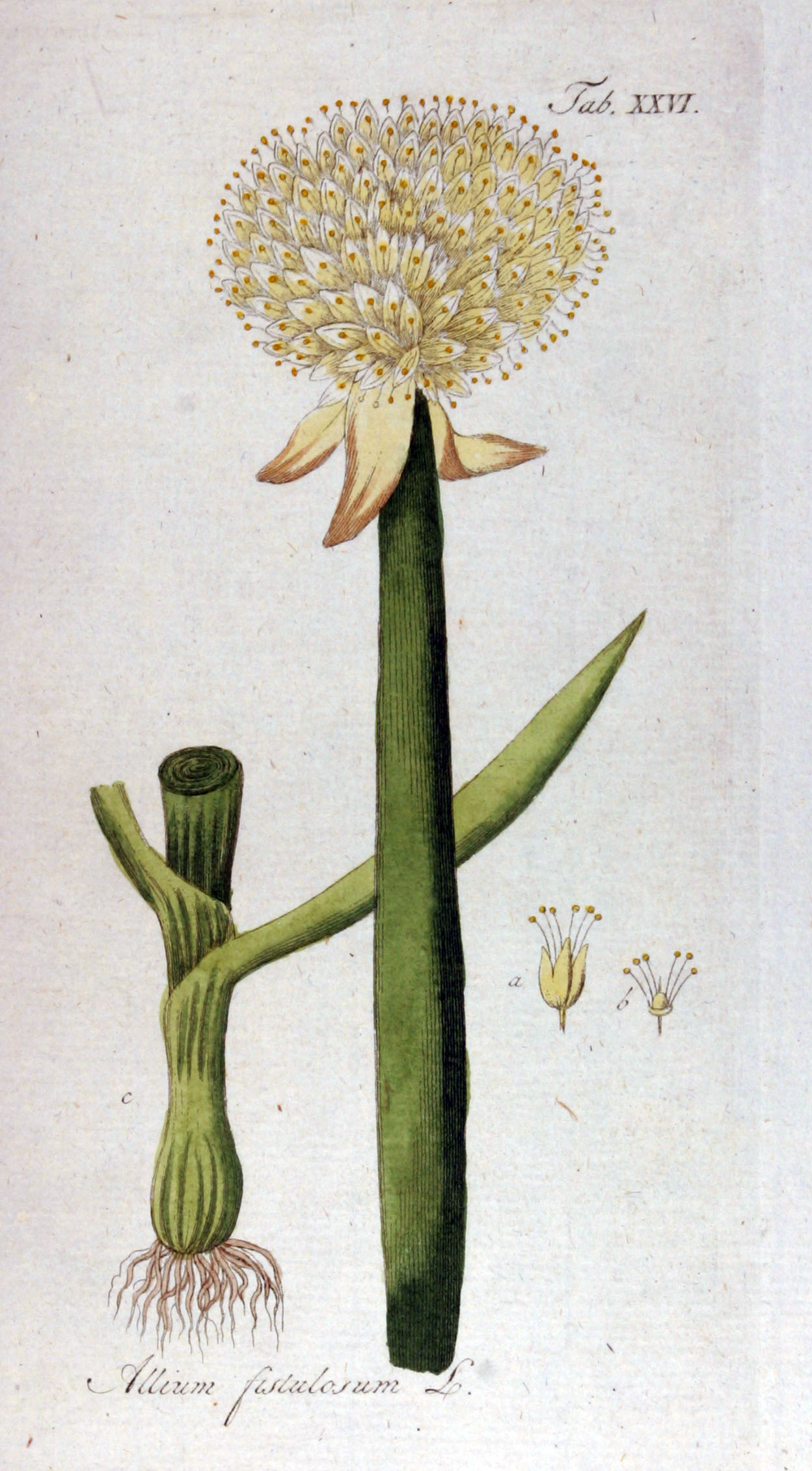
Illustration

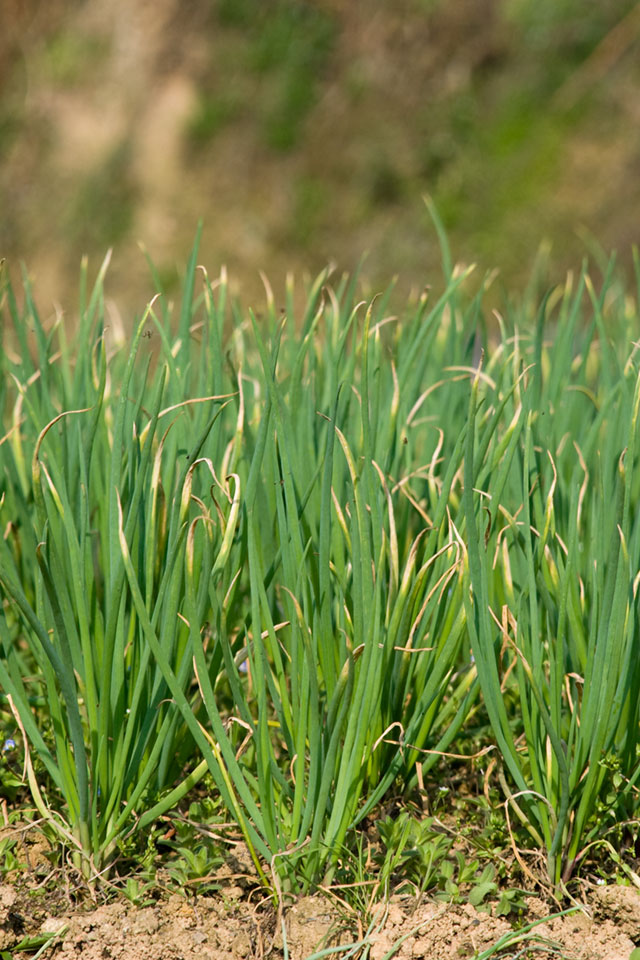
Guizhou, China

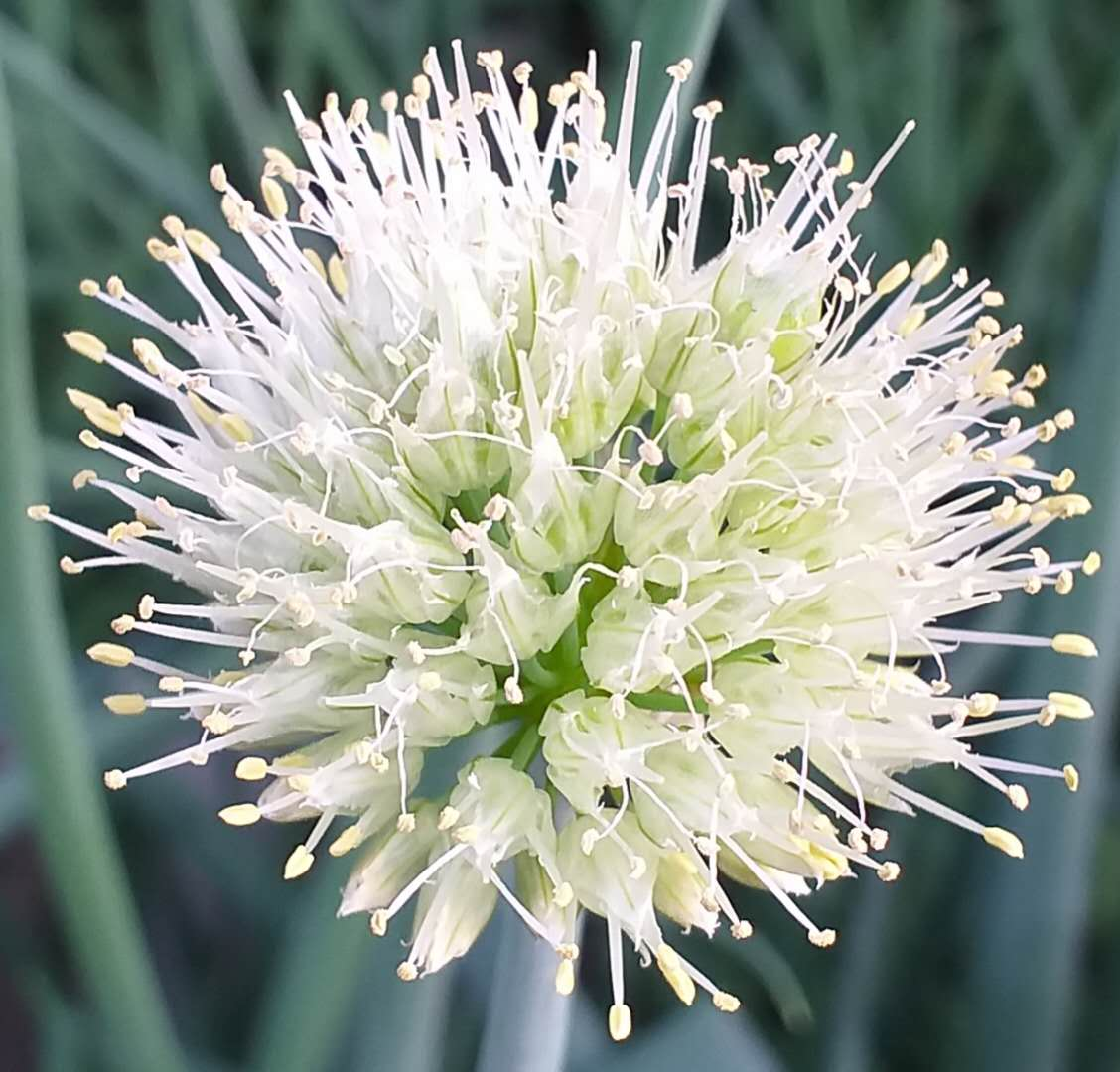
Umbel close-up

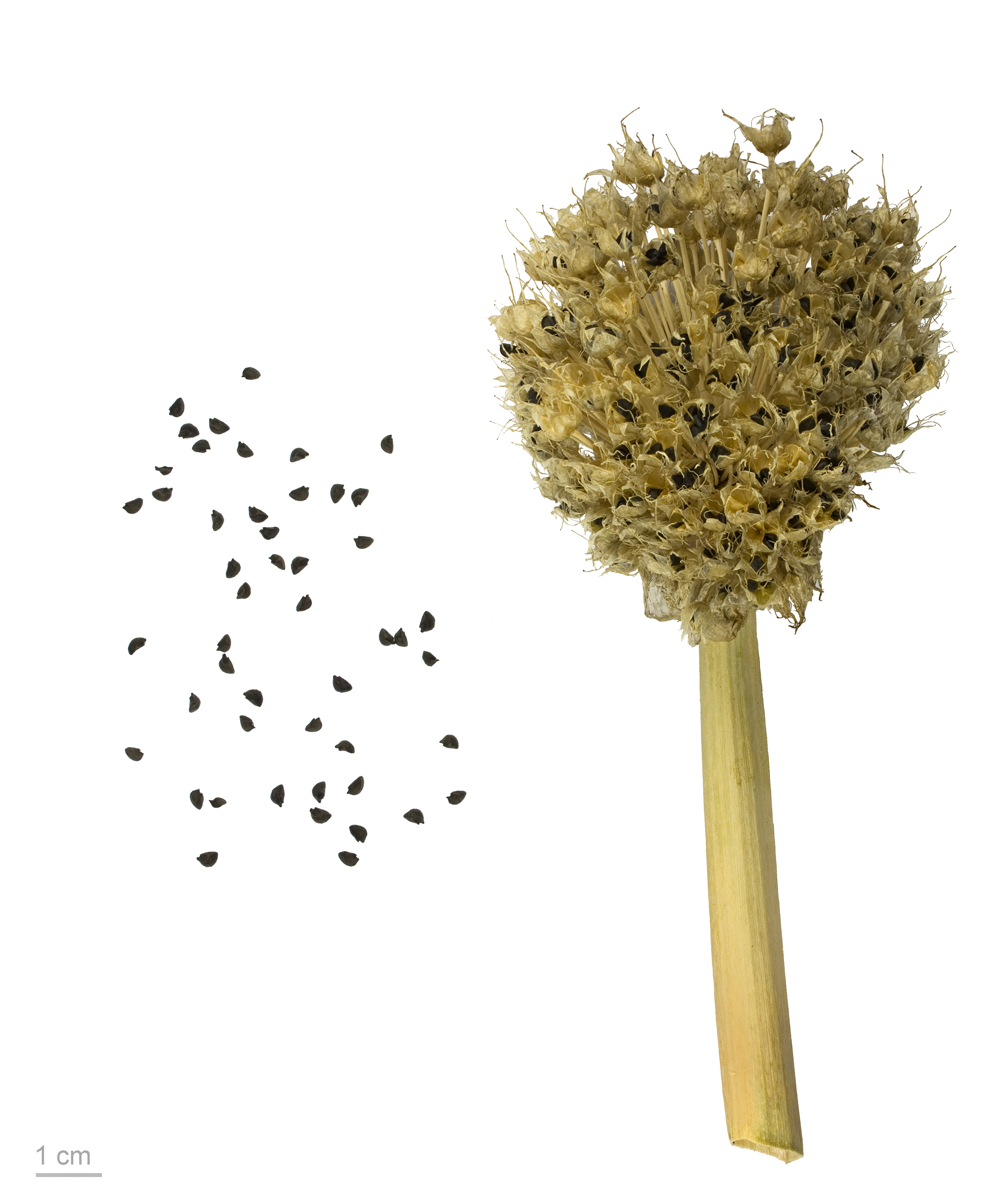
MHNT specimen

Close-up of the Umbel

=== Similar species ===
The species is very similar in taste and odor to the related common onion, Allium cepa, and hybrids between the two (tree onions) exist. A. fistulosum, however, does not develop large bulbs, and its leaves and scapes are hollow (fistulosum means 'hollow'). Larger varieties, such as the Japanese negi, resemble the leek, and smaller varieties resemble chives.

== Distribution ==
The species was developed in Asia from a wild relative native to China. It is now widely cultivated for culinary use (being of ornamental value only when in bloom) and has been naturalized in North America and Eurasia.

Welsh onions, raw
Nutritional value per 100 g (3.5 oz)
- Energy: 142 kJ (34 kcal)
- Carbohydrates: 6.5 g
- Sugars: 2.18 g
- Dietary fiber: 2.4 g
- Fat: 0.4 g
- Protein: 1.9 g
Vitamins and minerals
Vitamins	Quantity %DV^{†}
Vitamin A equiv.	0% 0 μg
Thiamine (B1)	4% 0.05 mg
Riboflavin (B2)	7% 0.09 mg
Niacin (B3)	3% 0.4 mg
Pantothenic acid (B5)	3% 0.169 mg
Vitamin B6	4% 0.072 mg
Folate (B9)	4% 16 μg
Vitamin C	30% 27 mg
Vitamin E	3% 0.51 mg
Vitamin K	161% 193.4 μg
Minerals	Quantity %DV^{†}
Calcium	4% 52 mg
Iron	7% 1.22 mg
Magnesium	5% 23 mg
Manganese	6% 0.137 mg
Phosphorus	4% 49 mg
Potassium	7% 212 mg
Sodium	1% 17 mg
Zinc	5% 0.52 mg
- Link to USDA Database entry
- ^{†}Percentages estimated using US recommendations for adults, except for potassium, which is estimated based on expert recommendation from the National Academies.

== Culinary uses ==
A. fistulosum is an ingredient in Asian cuisine, especially in East Asia and Southeast Asia. It is particularly important in China, Japan, Taiwan and Korea.

In the West, A. fistulosum is primarily used as a scallion or salad onion, but is more widely used in other parts of the world, particularly East Asia.

=== China ===
In China, it is often used in scallion pancakes, and as a garnish for a variety of dishes. It is also mixed with meat, into shumai dumplings or pearl meatballs.

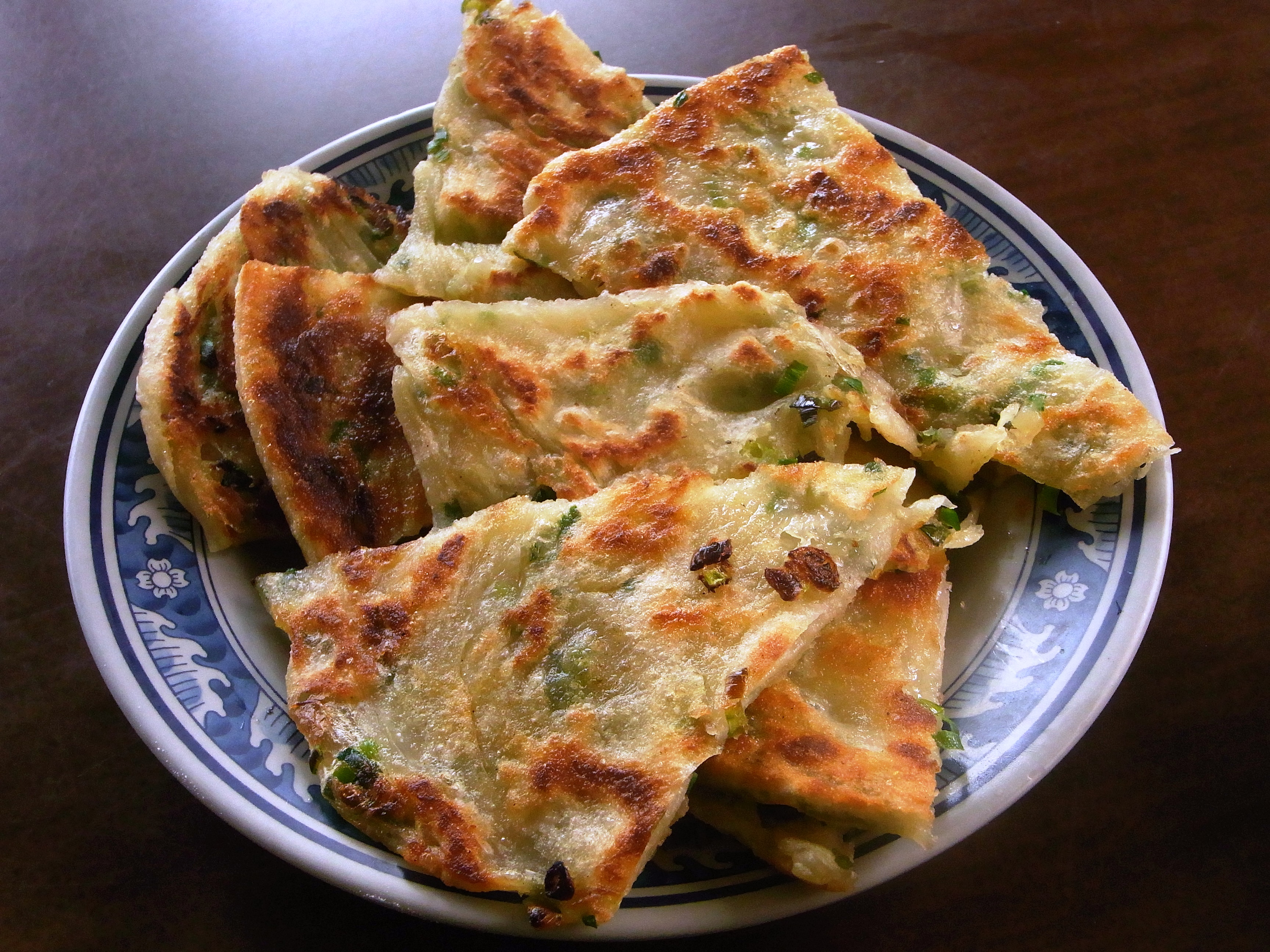
Scallion pancakes

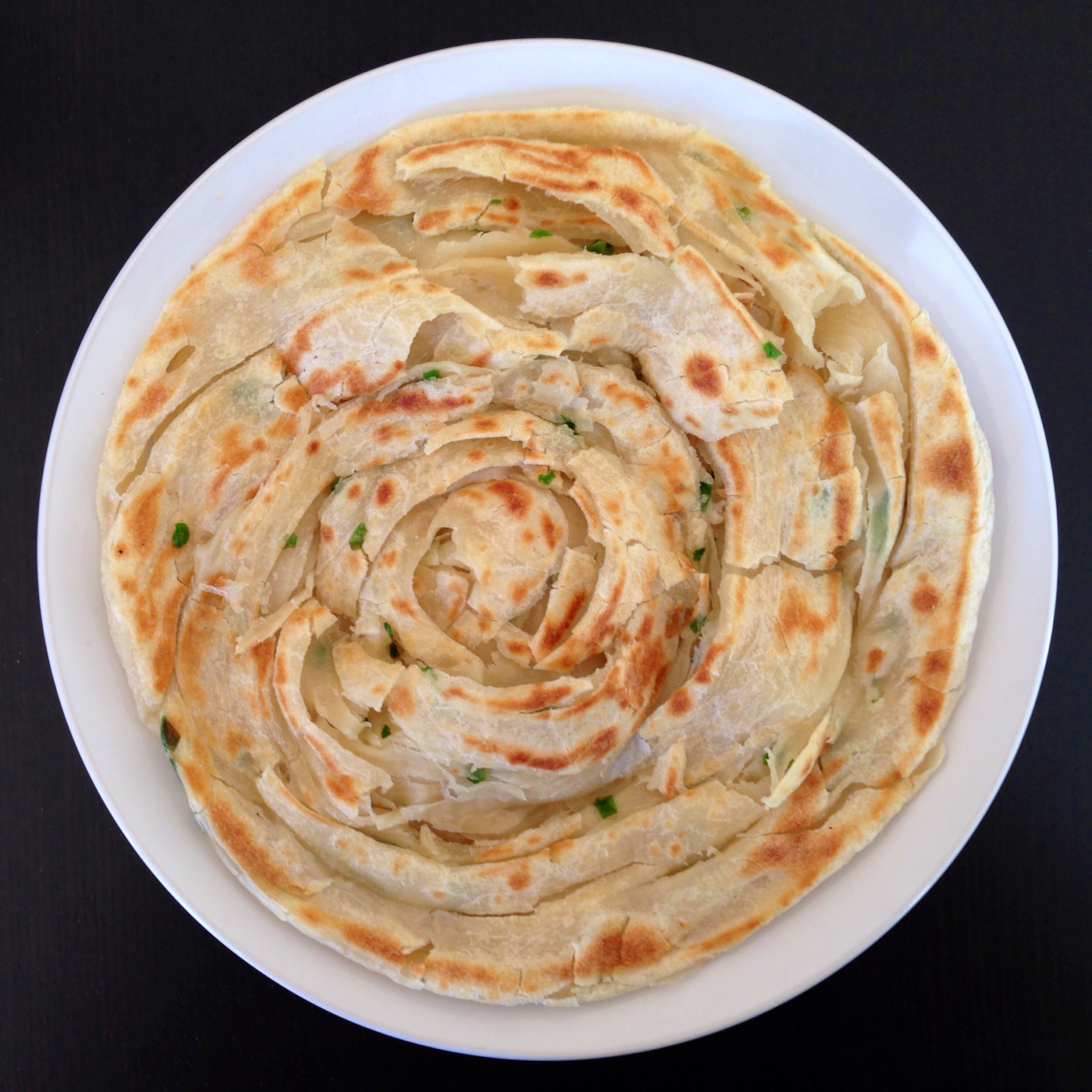

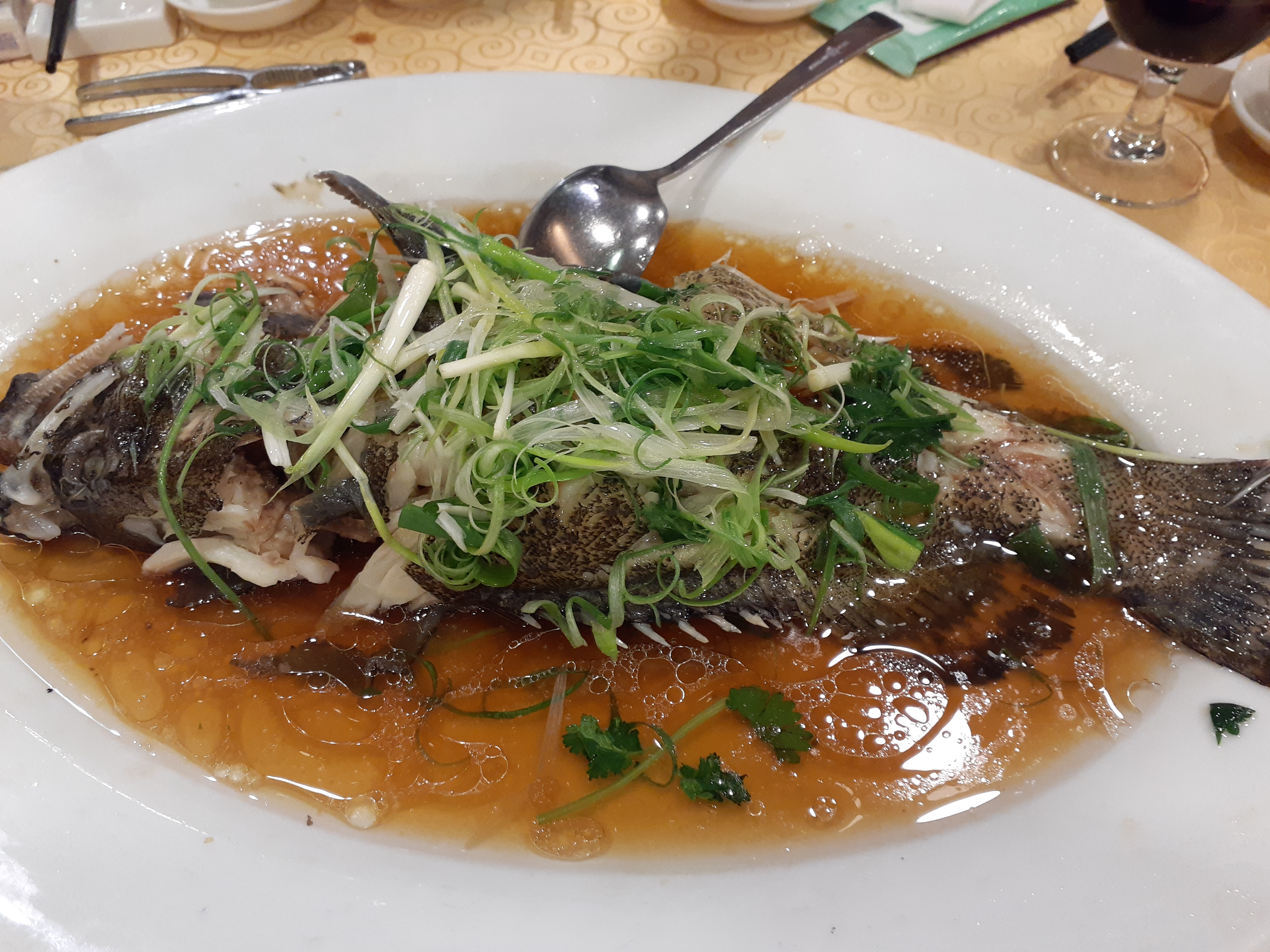
Scallion on steamed fish

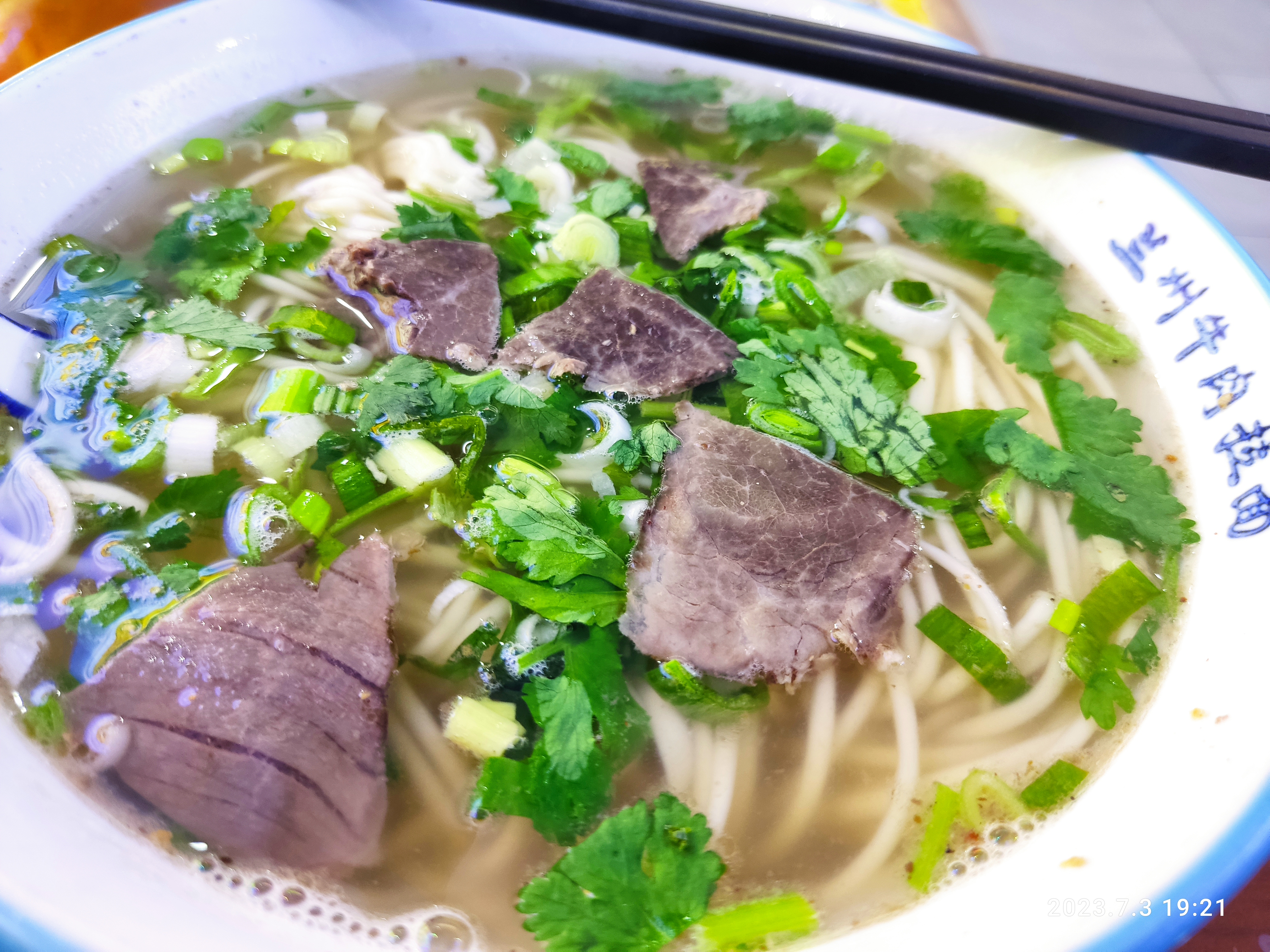
Lanzhou beef noodles

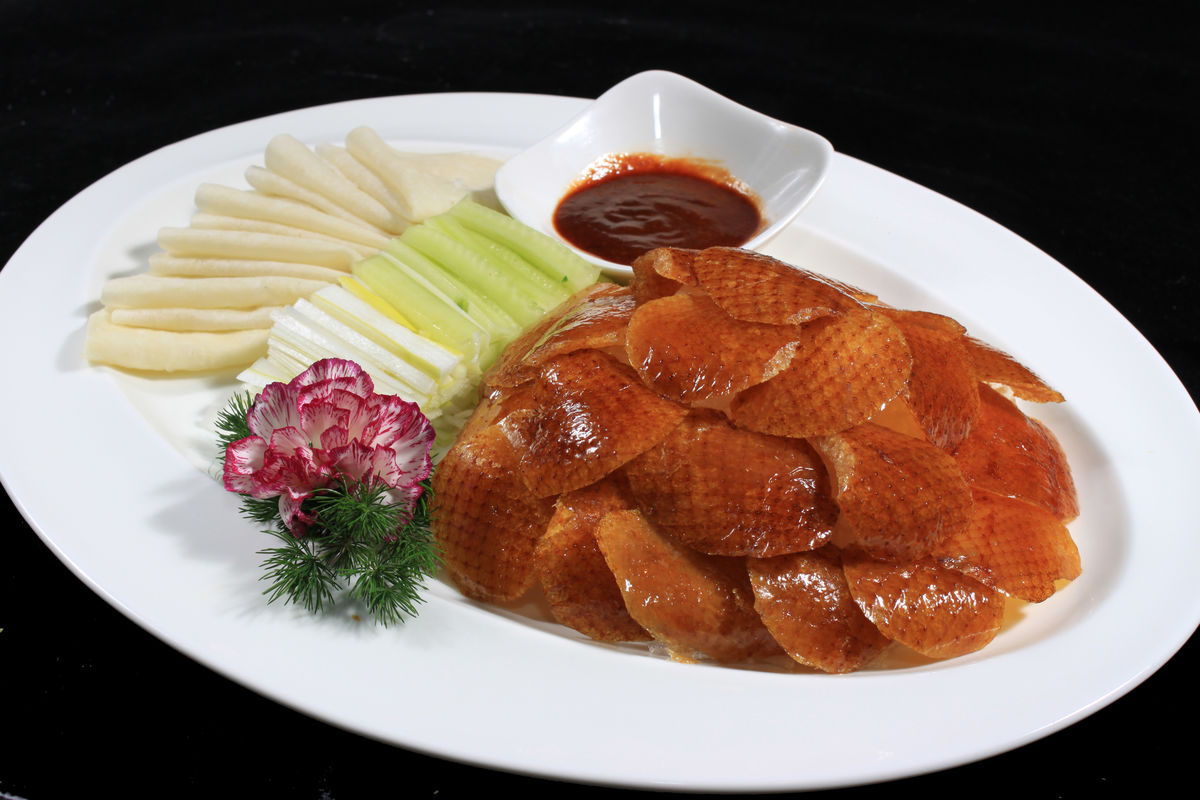
Garnish for Peking Duck

=== Japan ===
The Japanese name is negi (葱), which can also refer to other Allium plants, or more specifically naganegi (長葱), meaning "long onion". Common onions were introduced to East Asia in the 19th century, but A. fistulosum remains more popular and widespread. It is used in miso soup, negimaki (beef and scallion rolls), among other dishes, and it is in wide use as a sliced garnish, such as on teriyaki or takoyaki.

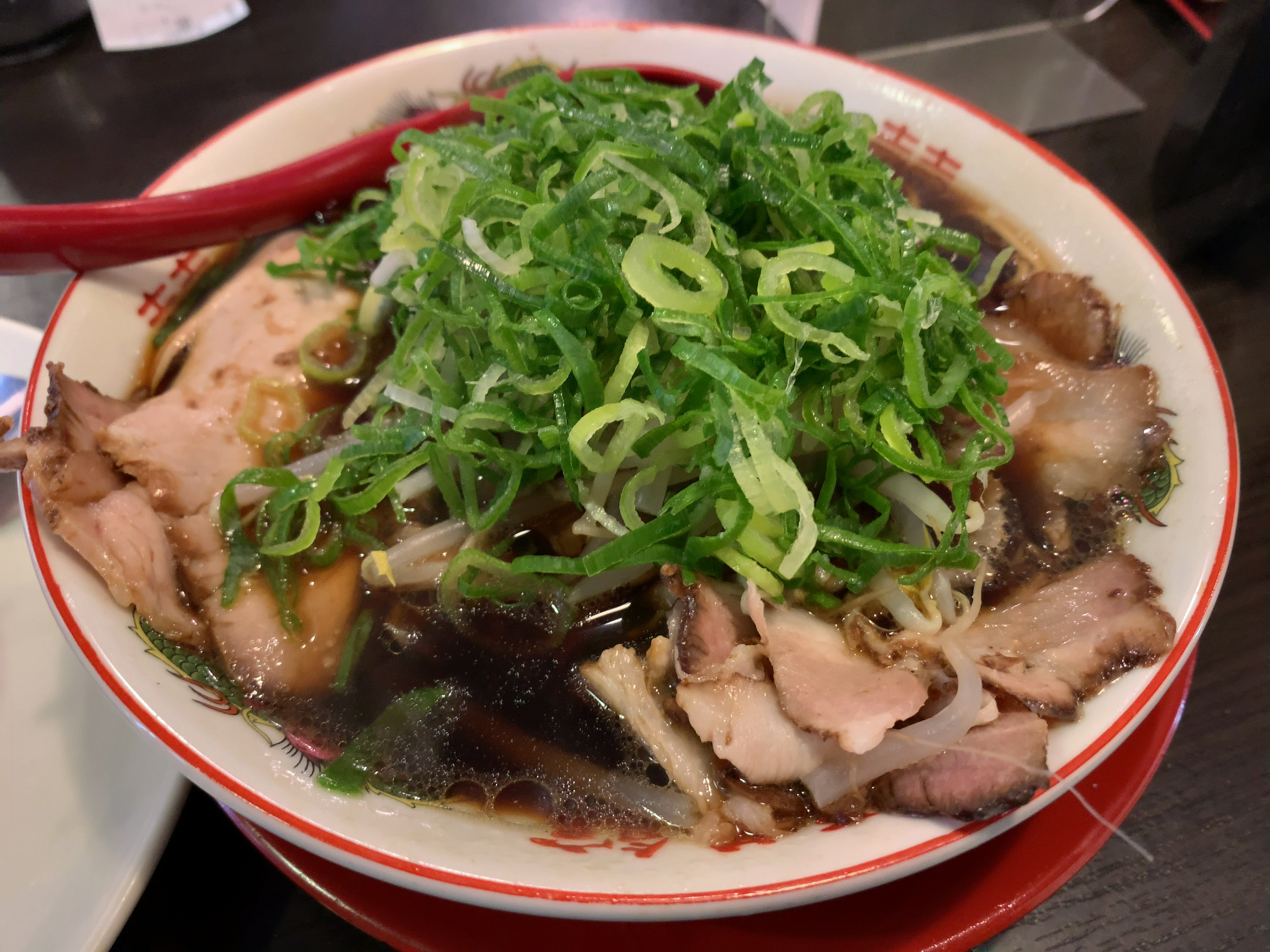
Ramen noodles with negi

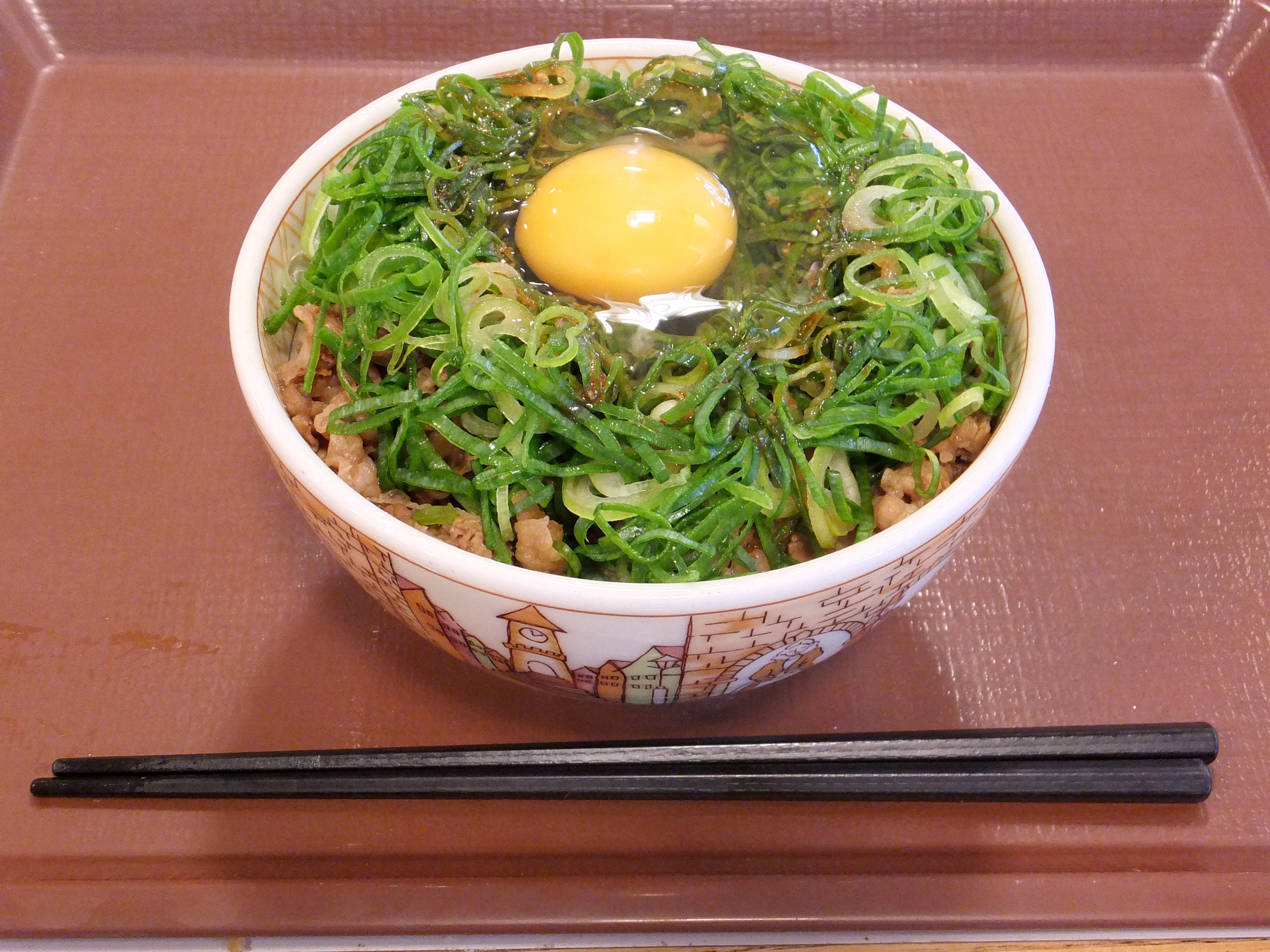
Gyūdon with negi and raw egg

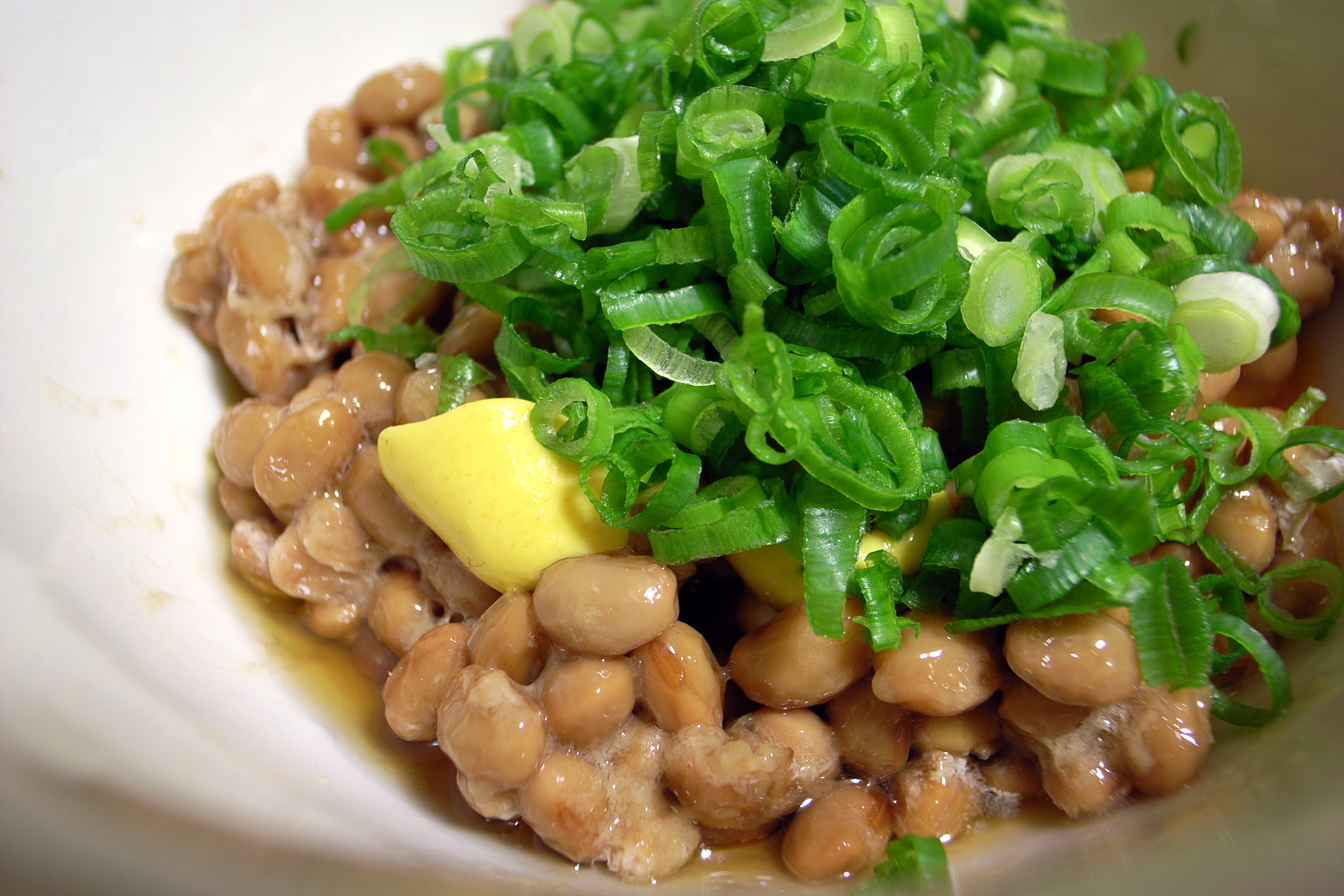
Nattō topped with negi

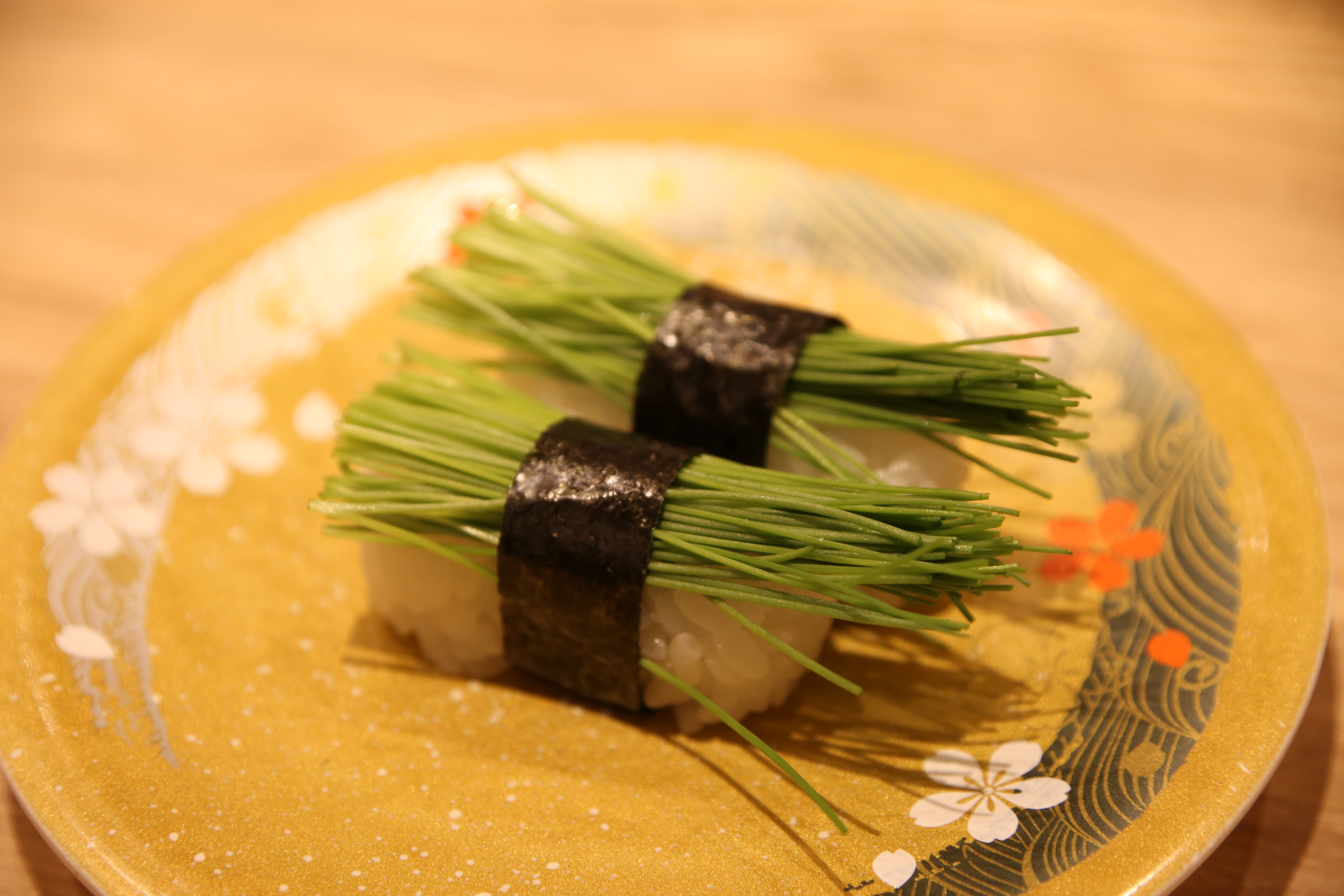
Sushi with negi sprouts

=== Korea ===
In Korea, A. fistulosum along with A. × proliferum is called pa (파, "scallion"), while common onions are called yangpa (양파, "Western scallion"). Larger varieties, looking similar to leek and sometimes referred to as "Asian leek", are called daepa (대파, "big scallion"), while the thinner early variety is called silpa (실파, "thread scallion"). A similar scallion plant, A. × wakegi (now considered a synonym of A. × proliferum), is called jjokpa (쪽파). Both daepa and silpa are usually used as a spice, herb, or garnish in Korean cuisine. The white part of daepa is often used as the flavour base for various broths and infused oil, while the green part of silpa is preferred as garnish. Dishes using daepa include pa-jangajji (pickled scallions), pa-mandu (scallion dumplings), pa-sanjeok (skewered beef and scallions), and padak (scallion chicken), which is a variety of Korean fried chicken topped with shredded raw daepa. Dishes using silpa include pa-namul (seasoned scallions), pa-jangguk (scallion beef-broth soup), and pa-ganghoe (parboiled scallion rolls) where silpa is used as a ribbon that bundles other ingredients.

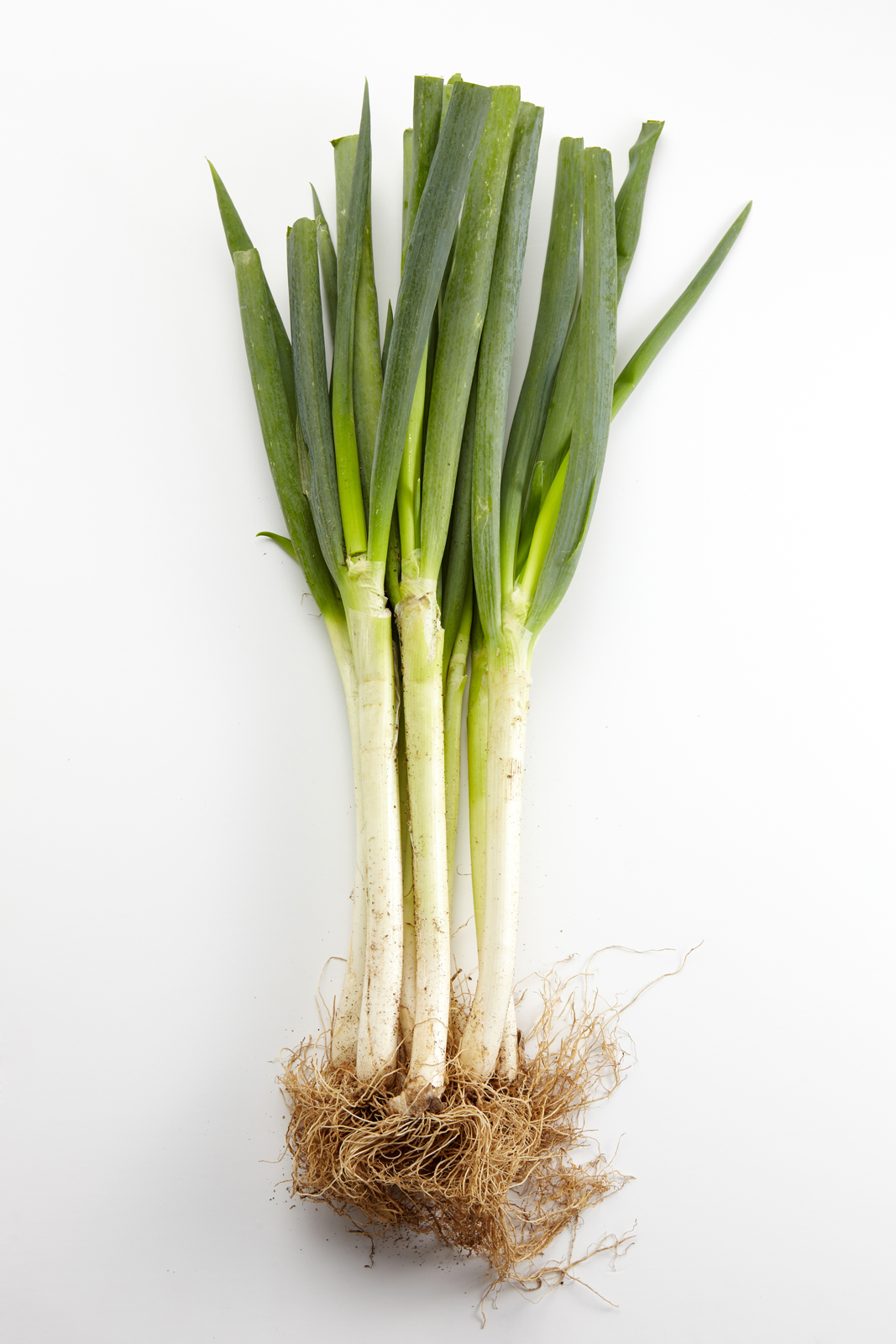
Thick daepa type

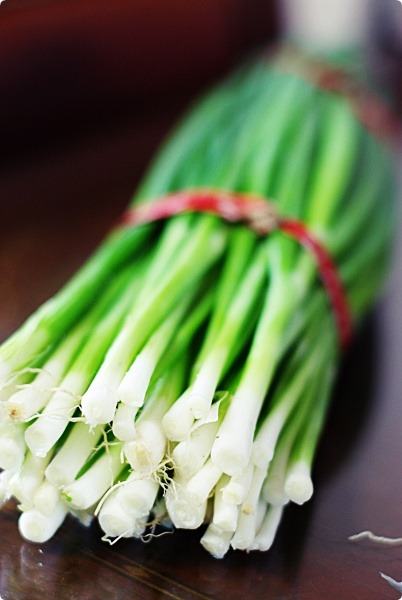
Thin silpa type

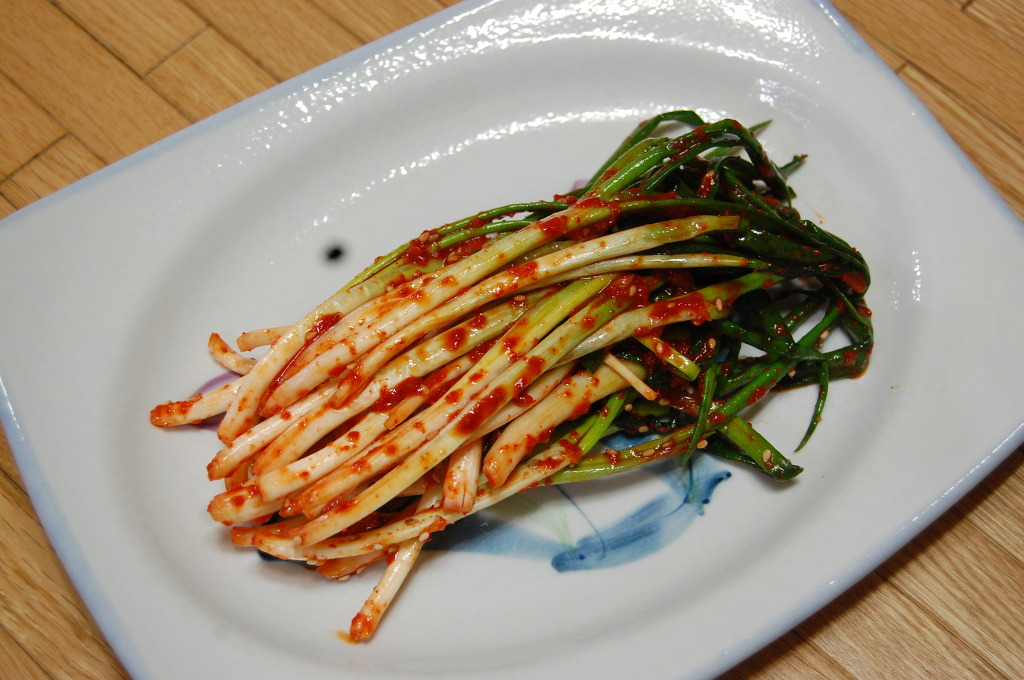
Scallion kimchi

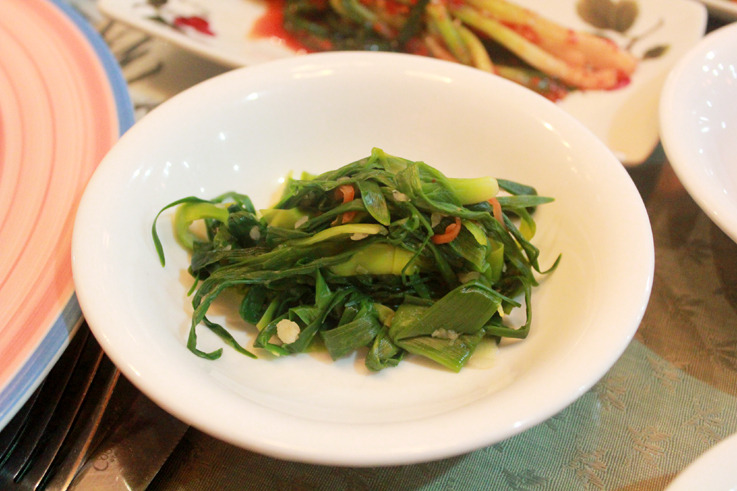
Pa-namul (seasoned blanched scallions)

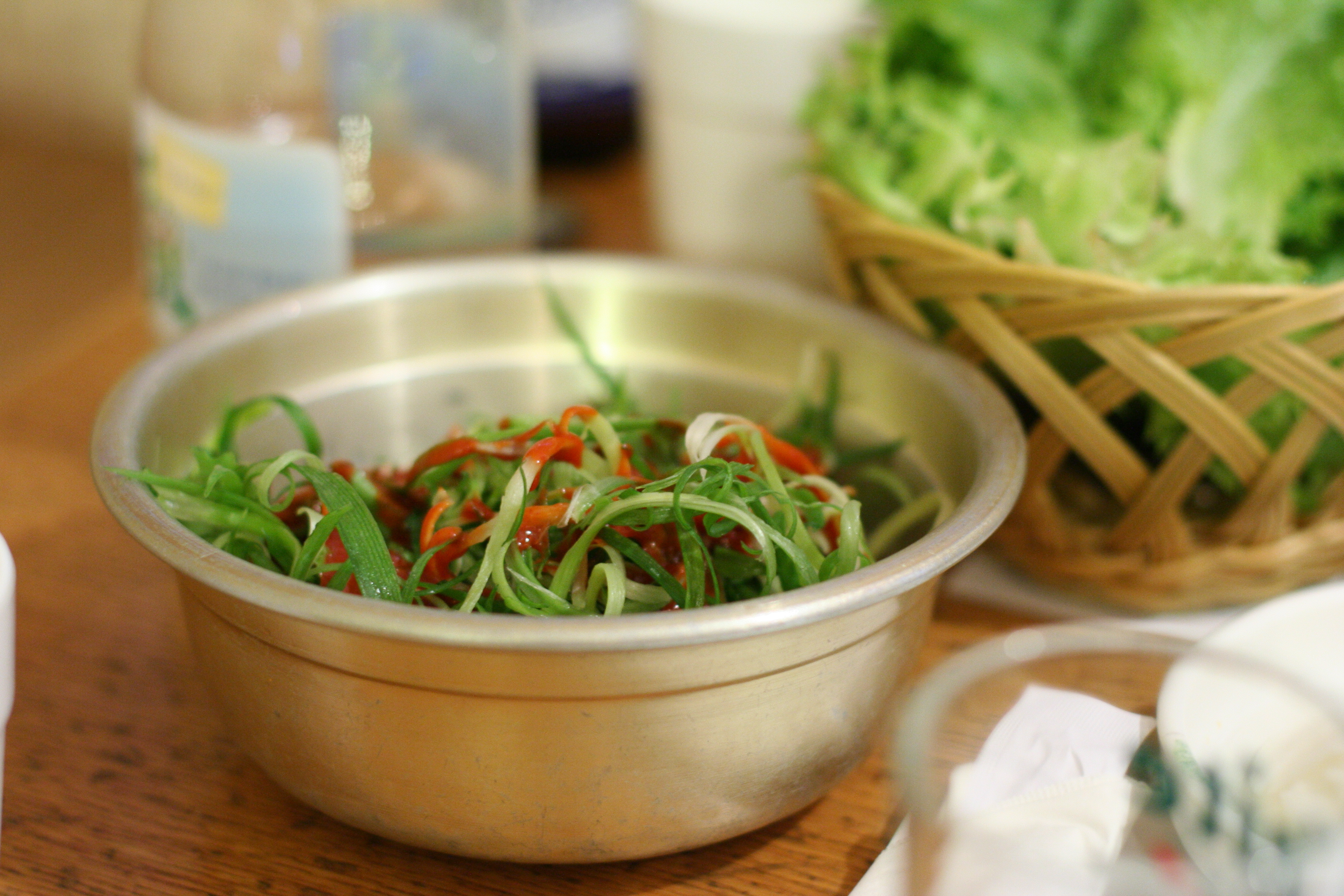
Pa-muchim (seasoned shredded scallions) eaten with samgyeopsal (grilled pork belly)

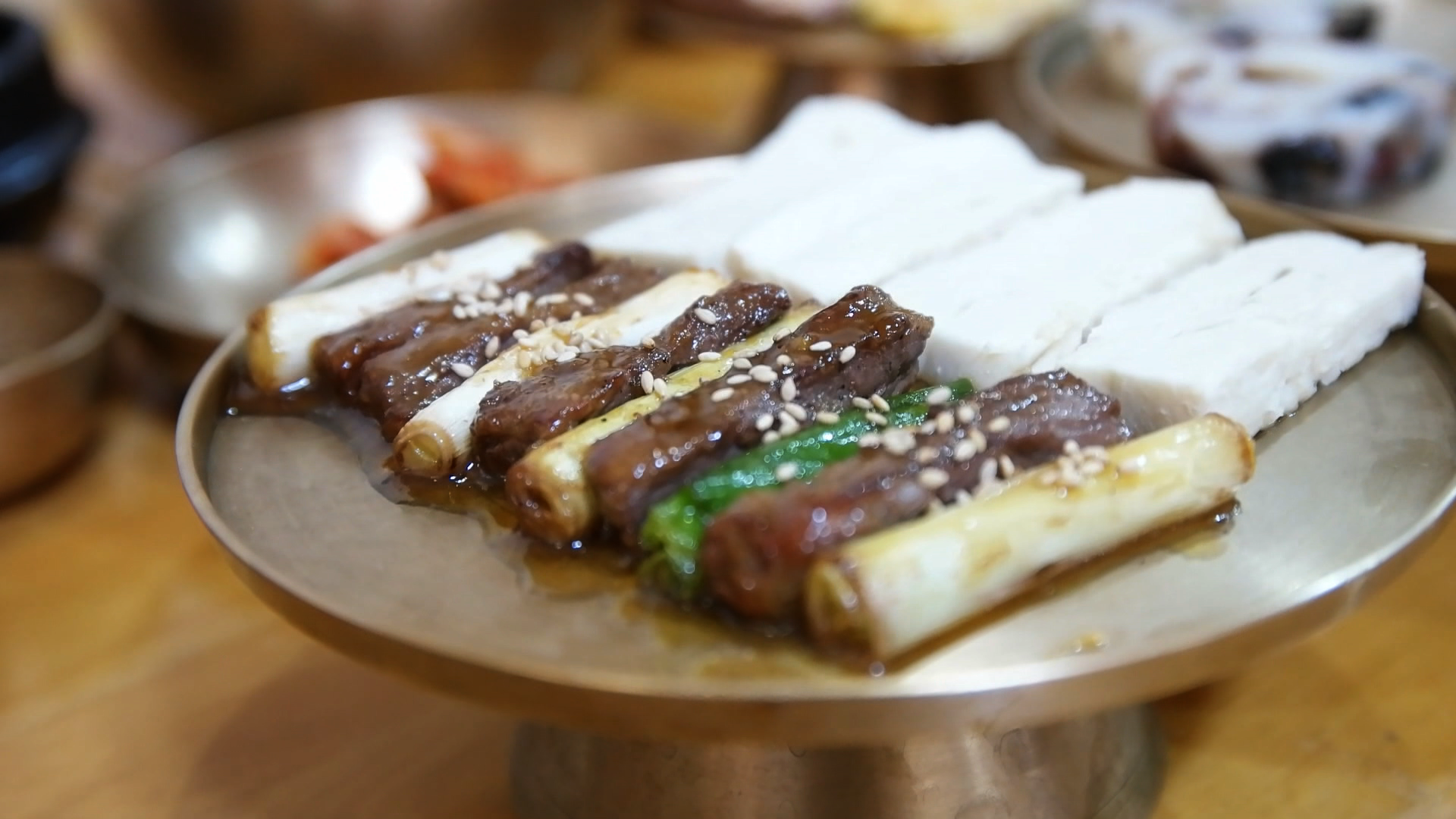
Pa-sanjeok (skewered beef and scallions)

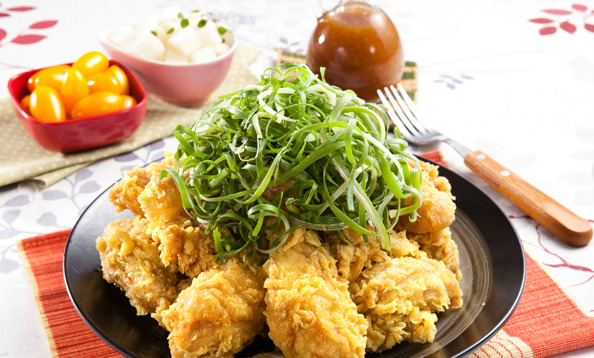
Padak (scallion chicken)

=== Russia ===
A. fistulosum is used in Russia in the spring for adding green leaves to salads.

=== Jamaica ===
Known as escallion, A. fistulosum is an ingredient in Jamaican cuisine, in combination with thyme, Scotch bonnet pepper, garlic, and allspice (called pimento). Recipes with escallion sometimes suggest leek as a substitute in salads. Jamaican dried spice mixtures using escallion are available commercially.

The Jamaican name is probably a variant of scallion, the term used loosely for the spring onion and various other plants in the genus Allium.

=== Argentina ===
It is used to make empanadas and locro, as well as other traditional dishes.

== See also ==
- List of Allium species
