= Chloroauric acid =

- Tetrahydrate

Names
- IUPAC name Tetrachloroauric(III) acid
- Other names: Hydrogen tetrachloroaurate; Hydrogen tetrachloroaurate(III); Chlorauric acid; Aurochloric acid; Aurate(1−), tetrachloro-, hydrogen, (SP-4-1)-; Hydrogen aurichloride; brown gold chloride

Identifiers
CAS Number	16903-35-8; 16961-25-4 (trihydrate)
3D model (JSmol)	Interactive image
ChemSpider	26171
ECHA InfoCard	100.037.211
EC Number	240-948-4
PubChem CID	28133
UNII	8H372EGX3V; 31KV0KH4AY (trihydrate)
CompTox Dashboard (EPA)	DTXSID701014499 DTXSID90156444, DTXSID701014499
- InChI: InChI=1S/Au.4ClH/h;4*1H/q+3;;;;/p-3 Key: VDLSFRRYNGEBEJ-UHFFFAOYSA-K; InChI=1/Au.4ClH.Na/h;4*1H;/q+3;;;;;+1/p-4/rAuCl4.Na/c2-1(3,4)5;/q-1;+1 Key: IXPWAPCEBHEFOV-ACHCXQQJAP; InChI=1/Au.4ClH/h;4*1H/q+3;;;;/p-3/rAuCl4/c2-1(3,4)5/q-1/p+1 Key: VDLSFRRYNGEBEJ-ZXMCYSOYAI
- SMILES: [H+].Cl[Au-](Cl)(Cl)Cl

Properties
Chemical formula	H[AuCl_{4}]
Molar mass	339.785 g/mol (anhydrous); 393.833 g/mol (trihydrate); 411.85 g/mol (tetrahydrate)
Appearance	orange-yellow needle-like hygroscopic crystals
Density	2.89 g/cm^{3} (tetrahydrate)
Melting point	41 °C (106 °F; 314 K) (tetrahydrate)
Solubility in water	350 g of H[AuCl_{4}] in 100 g of H_{2}O
Solubility	soluble in alcohol, ester, ether, ketone
log P	2.67510
Conjugate base	Tetrachloroaurate(III)

Structure
Crystal structure	Monoclinic
Space group	C2/m (No. 12)
Lattice constant	a = 11.78 Å, b = 4.62 Å, c = 8.89 Å α = 90°, β = 101.9°°, γ = 90°
Coordination geometry	Square planar at Au

Hazards
- GHS labelling
Pictograms	(GHS05: Corrosive) (GHS07: Exclamation mark) (GHS08: Health hazard) (GHS09: Environmental hazard)
Signal word	Danger
Hazard statements	H302, H314, H317, H373, H411
Precautionary statements	P260, P264, P272, P280, P301+P330+P331, P302+P352, P303+P361+P353, P304+P340, P305+P351+P338, P310, P321, P333+P313, P363, P405, P501
NFPA 704 (fire diamond)	3 0 1
Safety data sheet (SDS)	JT Baker

Related compounds
Other anions	Tetrabromoauric acid
Related compounds	Gold(III) chloride
- Except where otherwise noted, data are given for materials in their standard state (at 25 °C [77 °F], 100 kPa). verify (what is ?) Infobox references

Chloroauric acid is an inorganic compound with the chemical formula H[AuCl_{4}]. It forms hydrates H[AuCl_{4}]·nH_{2}O (n = 3, 4). Both the trihydrate and tetrahydrate are known. Both are orange-yellow solids consisting of the planar [AuCl_{4}]^{−} anion. Often, chloroauric acid is handled as a solution, such as those obtained by dissolution of gold in aqua regia. These solutions can be converted to other gold complexes or reduced to metallic gold, or gold nanoparticles.

== Production ==
Chloroauric acid is produced by dissolving gold in aqua regia (a mixture of concentrated nitric and hydrochloric acids) followed by careful evaporation of the solution:

Au(s) + HNO_{3}(aq) + 4 HCl(aq) → H[AuCl_{4}](aq) + NO(g) + 2 H_{2}O(l)

The tetrahydrate forms from evaporation. The trihydrate can be produced by the recrystallization of the tetrahydrate in ethanol. Under some conditions, oxygen can be used as an oxidant. For higher efficiency, these processes are conducted in autoclaves, which allows greater control of temperature and pressure. Alternatively, a solution of H[AuCl_{4}] can be produced by electrolysis of gold metal in hydrochloric acid:

2 Au(s) + 8 HCl(aq) → 2 H[AuCl_{4}](aq) + 3 H_{2}(g)

To prevent the deposition of gold on the cathode, the electrolysis is carried out in a cell equipped with a membrane. This method is used for refining gold. Some gold remains in solution in the form of [AuCl_{2}]^{−}.

== Properties ==
=== Structure ===
Crystal structure of HAuCl_{4}·4H_{2}O

The oxidation state of gold in H[AuCl_{4}] and [AuCl_{4}]^{−} anion is +3. The hydrates of tetrachloroauric acid contains [AuCl_{4}]^{−} anions (tetrachloroaurate(III) anions), which have square planar molecular geometry. The Au–Cl distances are around 2.28 Å. Other d^{8} complexes adopt similar structures, such as the tetrachloroplatinate(II) [PtCl_{4}]^{2−} ion. The tetrahydrate crystallizes as square-planar [AuCl_{4}]^{−} ions stacked with interleaved layers of [H_{5}O_{2}]^{+} ions interconnected by H_{2}O molecules.

=== Solute properties ===
Solid chloroauric acid is a hydrophilic (ionic) protic solute. It is soluble in water and other oxygen-containing solvents, such as alcohols, esters, ethers, and ketones. For example, in dry dibutyl ether or diethylene glycol, the solubility exceeds 1 M. Saturated solutions in the organic solvents often are the liquid solvates of specific stoichiometry. Chloroauric acid is a strong monoprotic acid.

When heated in air, solid H[AuCl_{4}]·nH_{2}O melts in the water of crystallization, quickly darkens and becomes dark brown.

=== Chemical reactions ===
Since [AuCl_{4}]^{−} is prone to hydrolyze, upon treatment with an alkali metal base, chloroauric acid converts to gold(III) hydroxide. The related thallium salt(Tl^{+}[AuCl_{4}]^{−}) is poorly soluble in all nonreacting solvents. Salts of quaternary ammonium cations are known. Other complex salts include [Au(bipy)Cl_{2}]^{+}[AuCl_{4}]^{−} and [Co(NH_{3})_{6}]^{3+}[AuCl_{4}]^{−}(Cl^{−})_{2}.

Partial reduction of chloroauric acid gives oxonium dichloridoaurate(1−). Reduction may also yield other gold(I) complexes, especially with organic ligands. Often the ligand serves as reducing agent as illustrated with thiourea, CS(NH_{2})_{2}:

[AuCl_{4}]^{−} + 3 CS(NH_{2})_{2} + H_{2}O → [Au(CS(NH_{2})_{2})_{2}]^{+} + CO(NH_{2})_{2} + S + 2 Cl^{−} + 2 HCl

Chloroauric acid is the precursor to gold nanoparticles by precipitation onto mineral supports. Heating of H[AuCl_{4}]·nH_{2}O in a stream of chlorine gives gold(III) chloride (Au_{2}Cl_{6}). Gold nanostructures can be made from chloroauric acid in a two-phase redox reaction whereby metallic clusters are amassed through the simultaneous attachment of self-assembled thiol monolayers on the growing nuclei. [AuCl_{4}]^{−} is transferred from aqueous solution to toluene using tetraoctylammonium bromide where it is then reduced with aqueous sodium borohydride in the presence of a thiol.

== Uses ==
Chloroauric acid is the precursor used in the purification of gold by electrolysis.

Liquid–liquid extraction of chloroauric acid is used for the recovery, concentrating, purification, and analytical determinations of gold. Of great importance is the extraction of H[AuCl_{4}] from hydrochloric medium by oxygen-containing extractants, such as alcohols, ketones, ethers and esters. The concentration of gold(III) in the extracts may exceed 1 mol/L. Frequently used extractants for this purpose are dibutyl glycol, methyl isobutyl ketone, tributyl phosphate, dichlorodiethyl ether (chlorex).

In histology, chlorauric acid is known as "brown gold chloride", and its sodium salt Na[AuCl_{4}] (sodium tetrachloroaurate(III)) as "gold chloride", "sodium gold chloride" or "yellow gold chloride". The sodium salt is used in a process called "toning" to improve the optical definition of tissue sections stained with silver.

In photography, chloroauric acid can be used as a gold toner.

== Health effects and safety ==
Chloroauric acid is a strong eye, skin, and mucous membrane irritant. Prolonged skin contact with chloroauric acid may result in tissue destruction. Concentrated chloroauric acid is corrosive to skin and must, therefore, be handled with appropriate care, since it can cause skin burns, permanent eye damage, and irritation to mucous membranes. Gloves are worn when handling the compound.
