= Silver halide =

Silver-based salt used in photographic film and traditional photographic paper

A silver halide (or silver salt) is one of the chemical compounds that can form between the element silver (Ag) and one of the halogens; in particular, bromine (Br), chlorine (Cl), iodine (I) and fluorine (F) may each combine with silver to produce silver bromide (AgBr), silver chloride (AgCl), silver iodide (AgI), and four forms of silver fluoride, respectively.

As a group, they are often referred to as the silver halides, and are often given the pseudo-chemical notation AgX. Although most silver halides involve silver atoms with oxidation states of +1 (Ag^{+}), silver halides in which the silver atoms have oxidation states of +2 (Ag^{2+}) are known, of which silver(II) fluoride is the only known stable one.

Silver halides are light-sensitive chemicals, and are commonly used in photographic film and paper.

== Applications ==
=== Light sensitivity ===
Silver halides are used in photographic film and photographic paper, including graphic art film and paper, where silver halide crystals in gelatin are coated on to a film base, glass or paper substrate. The gelatin is a vital part of the emulsion as the protective colloid of appropriate physical and chemical properties. The gelatin may also contain trace elements (such as sulfur) which increase the light sensitivity of the emulsion, although modern practice uses gelatin without such components.

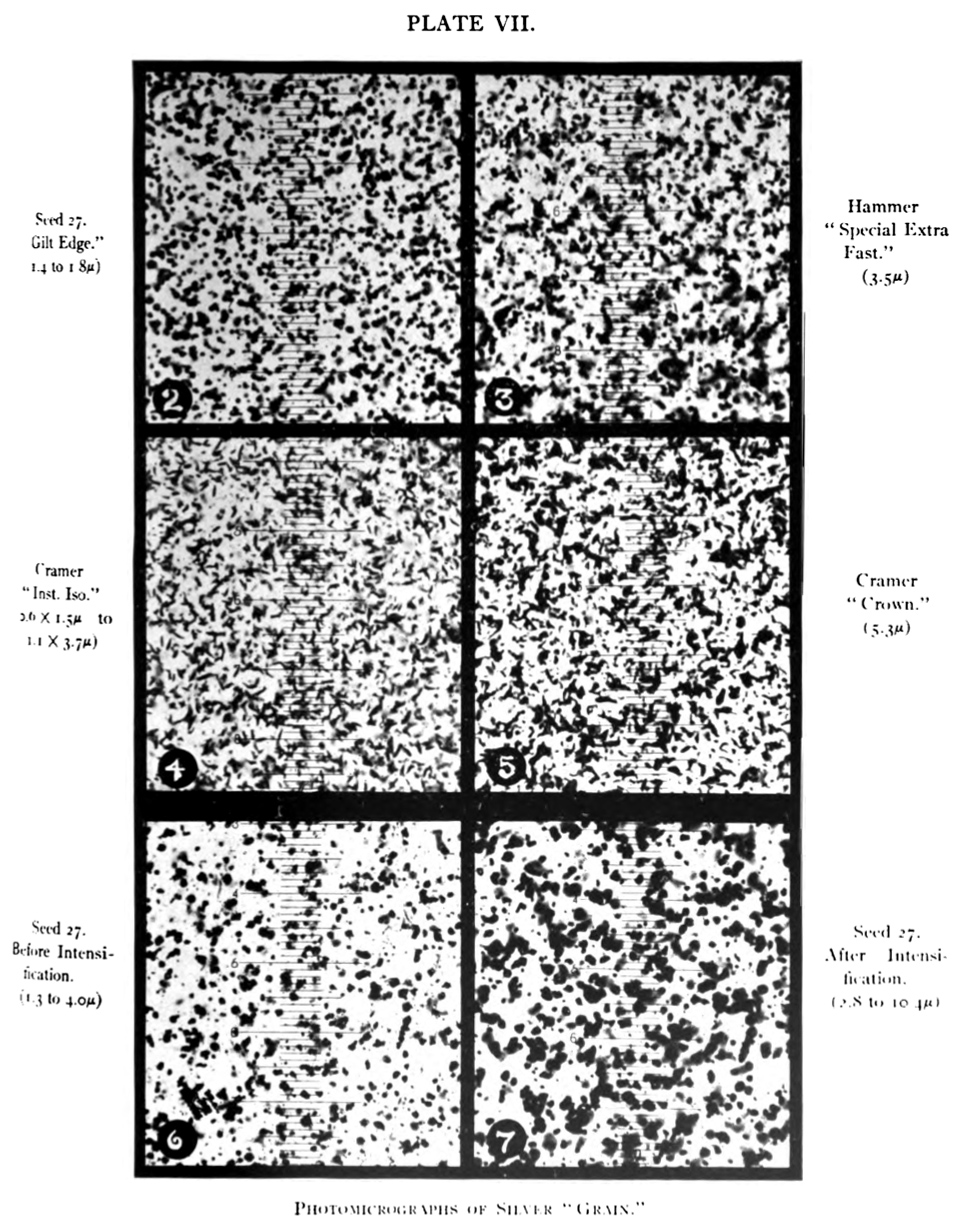
Silver halides in film emulsion

When a silver halide crystal is exposed to light, a sensitivity speck on the surface of the crystal is turned into a speck of metallic silver (these comprise the invisible or latent image). If the speck of silver contains approximately four or more atoms, it is rendered developable - meaning that it can undergo development which turns the entire crystal into metallic silver. Areas of the emulsion receiving larger amounts of light (reflected from a subject being photographed, for example) undergo the greatest development and therefore results in the highest optical density.

Silver bromide and silver chloride may be used separately or combined, depending on the sensitivity and tonal qualities desired in the product. Silver iodide is always combined with silver bromide or silver chloride, except in the case of some historical processes such as the collodion wet plate and daguerreotype, in which the iodide is sometimes used alone (generally regarded as necessary if a daguerreotype is to be developed by the Becquerel method, in which exposure to strong red light, which affects only the crystals bearing latent image specks, is substituted for exposure to mercury fumes). Silver fluoride is not used in photography.

When absorbed by an AgX crystal, photons cause electrons to be promoted to a conduction band (de-localized electron orbital with higher energy than a valence band) which can be attracted by a sensitivity speck, which is a shallow electron trap, which may be a crystalline defect or a cluster of silver sulfide, gold, other trace elements (dopant), or combination thereof, and then combined with an interstitial silver ion to form a silver metal speck.

Silver halides are also used to make corrective lenses darken when exposed to ultraviolet light (see photochromism).

=== Chemistry ===
The three common silver halide precipitates: AgI, AgBr & AgCl (left to right)

Silver halides, except for silver fluoride, are very insoluble in water. Silver nitrate can be used to precipitate halides; this application is useful in quantitative analysis of halides. ^{689-703} The three main silver halide compounds have distinctive colours that can be used to quickly identify halide ions in a solution. The silver chloride compound forms a white precipitate, silver bromide a creamy coloured precipitate and silver iodide a yellow coloured precipitate.

Some compounds can considerably increase or decrease the solubility of AgX. Examples of compounds that increase the solubility include: cyanide, thiocyanate, thiosulfate, thiourea, amines, ammonia, sulfite, thioether, crown ether. Examples of compounds that reduces the solubility include many organic thiols and nitrogen compounds that do not possess solubilizing group other than mercapto group or the nitrogen site, such as mercaptooxazoles, mercaptotetrazoles, especially 1-phenyl-5-mercaptotetrazole, benzimidazoles, especially 2-mercaptobenzimidazole, benzotriazole, and these compounds further substituted by hydrophobic groups. Compounds such as thiocyanate and thiosulfate enhance solubility when they are present in a sufficiently large quantity, due to formation of highly soluble complex ions, but they also significantly depress solubility when present in a very small quantity, due to formation of sparingly soluble complex ions.

=== Archival use ===
Silver halide can be used to deposit fine details of metallic silver on surfaces, such as film. Because of the chemical stability of metallic silver, this film can be used for archival purposes. For example, the Arctic World Archive uses film developed with silver halides to store data of historical and cultural interest, such as a snapshot of the Open Source code in all active GitHub repositories as of 2020.
