= Silver(I) fluoride =

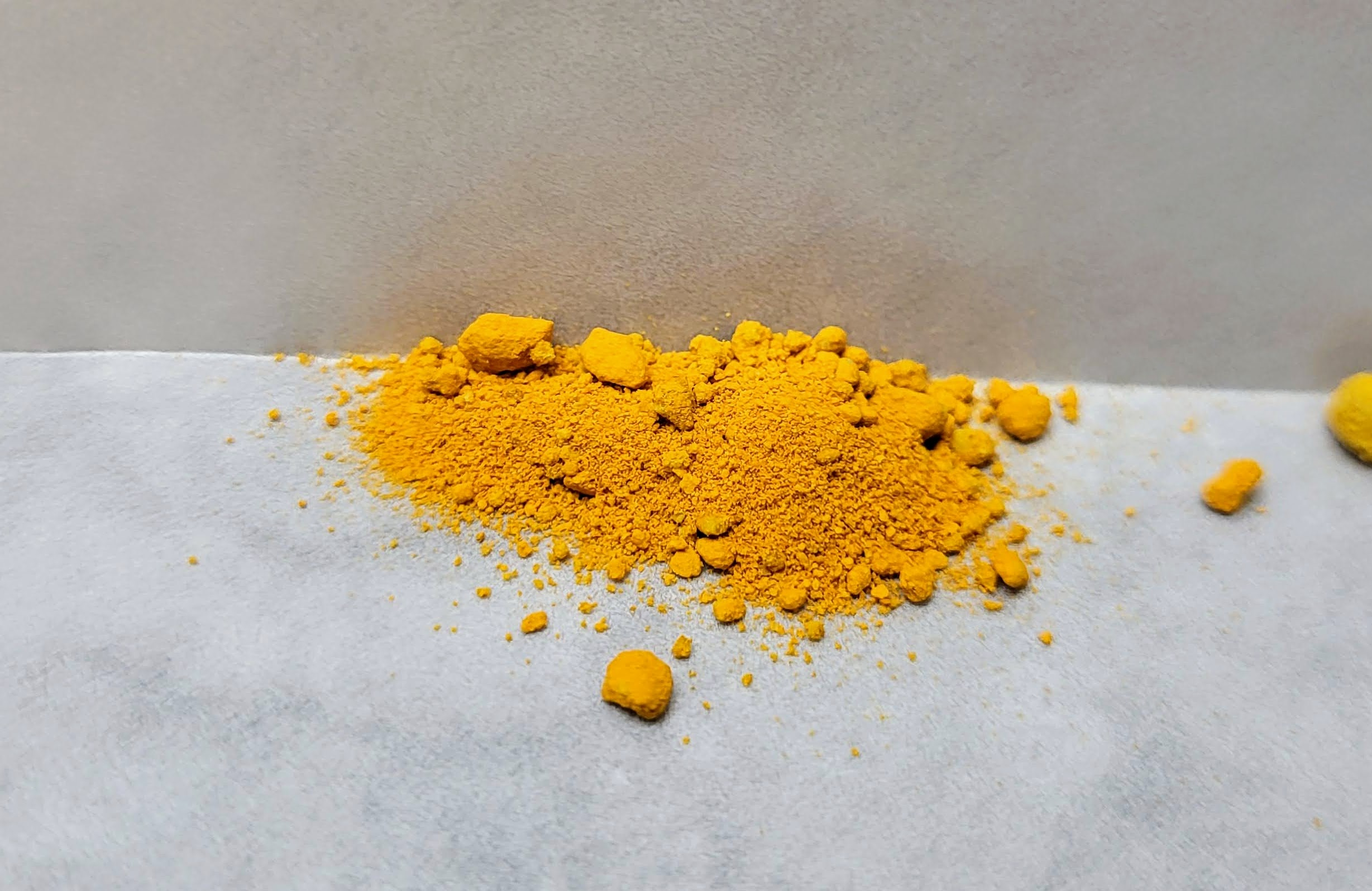
- Anhydrous

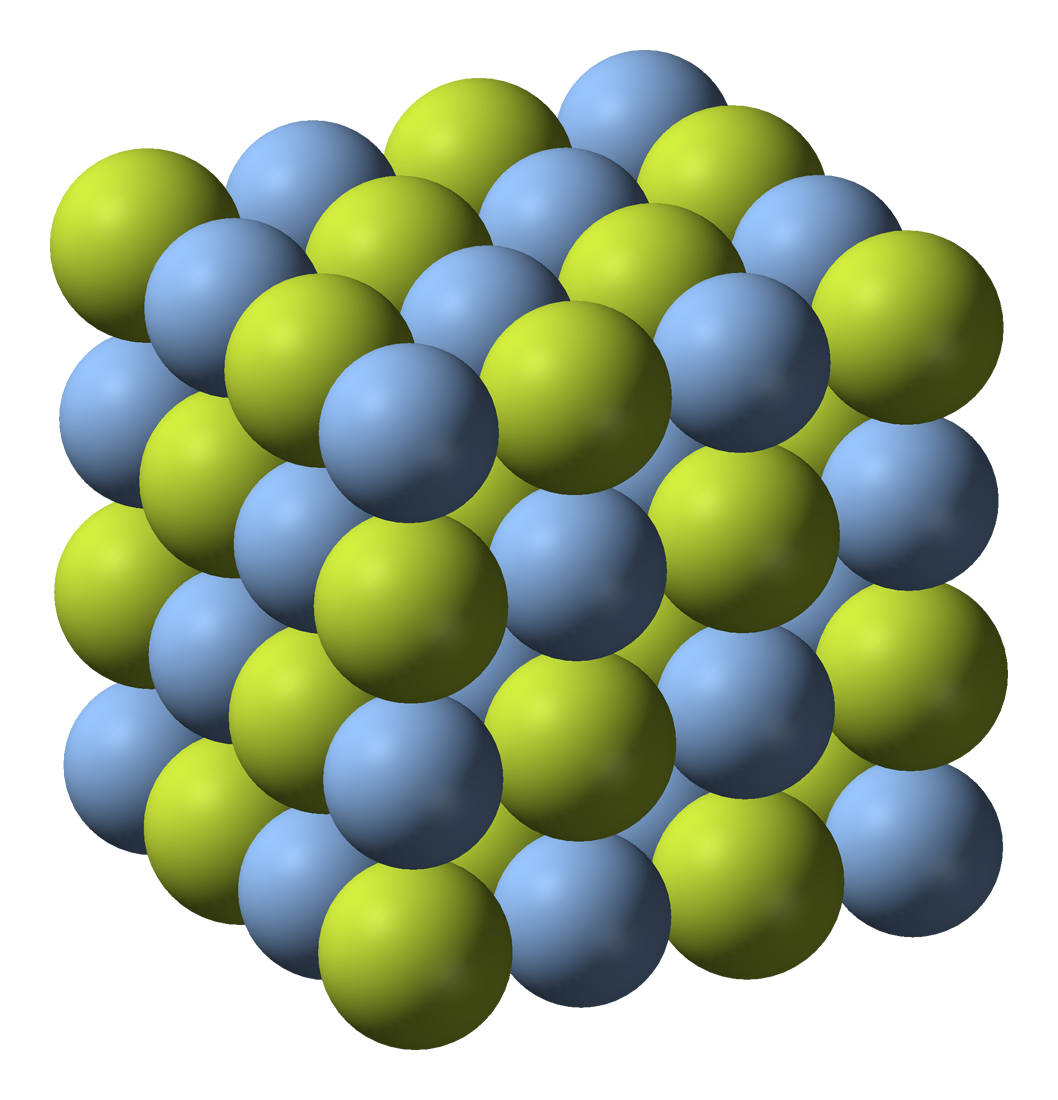

Names
- IUPAC name Silver(I) fluoride
- Other names Argentous fluoride Silver monofluoride

Identifiers
CAS Number	7775-41-9
3D model (JSmol)	Interactive image
ChEBI	CHEBI:30340
ChemSpider	56407
ECHA InfoCard	100.028.996
EC Number	231-895-8
Gmelin Reference	122625
PubChem CID	62656
RTECS number	VW4250000
UNII	1Z00ZK3E66
CompTox Dashboard (EPA)	DTXSID4042383
- InChI: InChI=1S/Ag.FH/h;1H/q+1;/p-1 Key: REYHXKZHIMGNSE-UHFFFAOYSA-M
- SMILES: [Ag+].[F-]

Properties
Chemical formula	AgF
Molar mass	126.8666 g·mol^{−1}
Appearance	yellow-brown solid (anhydrous) colorless solid (hydrate)
Density	5.852 g/cm^{3} (15 °C, anhydrous)
Melting point	435 °C (815 °F; 708 K)
Boiling point	1,159 °C (2,118 °F; 1,432 K)
Solubility in water	85.78 g/100 mL (0 °C); 119.8 g/100 mL (10 °C); 179.1 g/100 mL (25 °C); 213.4 g/100 mL (50 °C)
Solubility	83 g/100 g (11.9 °C) in hydrogen fluoride 1.5 g/100 mL in methanol (25 °C)
Magnetic susceptibility (χ)	−36.5·10^{−6} cm^{3}/mol

Structure
Crystal structure	cubic
Space group	Fm3̅m
Lattice constant	a = 4.922 Å α = 90°, β = 90°, γ = 90°
Lattice volume (V)	119.22 Å^{3}
Coordination geometry	Octahedral (both Ag and F)
Dipole moment	6.22 D

Thermochemistry
Heat capacity (C)	51.92 J/mol·K
Std molar entropy (S^{⦵}_{298})	83.68 J/mol·K
Std enthalpy of formation (Δ_{f}H^{⦵}_{298})	−204.6 kJ/mol
Gibbs free energy (Δ_{f}G^{⦵})	−186.6 kJ/mol

Hazards
- Occupational safety and health (OHS/OSH)
Main hazards	Corrosive
- GHS labelling
Pictograms	(GHS05: Corrosive)
Signal word	Danger
Hazard statements	H314
Precautionary statements	P260, P280, P303+P361+P353, P304+P340, P305+P351+P338, P310
NFPA 704 (fire diamond)	3 0 0

Related compounds
Other anions	Silver(I) chloride Silver(I) bromide Silver(I) iodide
Other cations	Copper(I) fluoride Gold(I) fluoride
Related compounds	Silver subfluoride Silver(II) fluoride Silver(III) fluoride
- Except where otherwise noted, data are given for materials in their standard state (at 25 °C [77 °F], 100 kPa). verify (what is ?) Infobox references

Silver(I) fluoride is the inorganic compound with the formula AgF. It is commonly found as the hygroscopic yellow anhydrous form, but various colorless hydrates, such as AgF·2H_{2}O and AgF·4H_{2}O, are also known. It is one of the three main fluorides of silver, the others being silver subfluoride and silver(II) fluoride. AgF has relatively few niche applications; it has been employed as a fluorination and desilylation reagent in organic synthesis and in aqueous solution as a topical caries treatment in dentistry.

== Preparation ==
High-purity silver(I) fluoride can be produced by the heating of silver carbonate to 310 °C (590 °F) under a hydrogen fluoride environment, in a platinum tube:

Ag_{2}CO_{3} + 2 HF → 2 AgF + H_{2}O + CO_{2}

Laboratory routes to the compound typically avoid the use of gaseous hydrogen fluoride. One method is the thermal decomposition of silver tetrafluoroborate:

AgBF_{4} → AgF + BF_{3}

In an alternative route, silver(I) oxide is dissolved in concentrated aqueous hydrofluoric acid, and the silver fluoride is precipitated out of the resulting solution by acetone.

Ag_{2}O + 2 HF → 2 AgF + H_{2}O

The hydrates, AgF·(H_{2}O)_{2} and AgF·(H_{2}O)_{4}, which are the only hydrates among the silver(I) halides, is formed by the evaporation of aqueous solutions of silver(I) fluoride.

== Properties ==
=== Structure ===
The structure of AgF has been determined by X-ray diffraction. At ambient temperature and pressure, silver(I) fluoride exists as the polymorph AgF-I, which adopts a cubic crystal system with space group Fm3̅m in the Hermann–Mauguin notation. The rock salt structure is also adopted by the other silver monohalides. The lattice parameter is 4.936(1) Å, significantly lower than those of AgCl and AgBr. Neutron and X-ray diffraction studies have further shown that at 2.70(2) GPa, a structural transition occurs to a second polymorph (AgF-II) with the caesium chloride structure, and lattice parameter 2.945 Å. The associated decrease in volume is approximately ten percent. A third polymorph, AgF-III, forms on reducing the pressure to 2.59(2) GPa, and has an inverse nickel arsenide structure. The lattice parameters are a = 3.244(2) Å and c = 6.24(1) Å; the rock salt structure is regained only on reduction of the pressure to 0.9(1) GPa. Non-stochiometric behaviour is exhibited by all three polymorphs under extreme pressures.

The structures of the dihydrate and tetrahydrate have also been determined by X-ray diffraction. The dihydrate and tetrahydrate adopt the orthorhombic and monoclinic crystal systems, respectively. In the dihydrate, the silver is coordinated in a trigonal bipyramidal fashion with four waters of crystallization and one fluoride ion, while the tetrahydrate has the silver coordinated octahedrally, forming interconnected Ag(H_{2}O)_{6}^{+} octahedra with separate fluoride ions.

=== Spectroscopy ===
Silver(I) fluoride exhibits unusual optical properties. Simple electronic band theory predicts that the fundamental exciton absorption for AgF would lie higher than that of AgCl (5.10 eV) and would correspond to a transition from an anionic valence band as for the other silver halides. Experimentally, the fundamental exciton for AgF lies at 4.63 eV. This discrepancy can be explained by positing transition from a valence band with largely silver 4d-orbital character. The high frequency refractive index is 1.73(2).

=== Photosensitivity ===
In contrast with the other silver halides, anhydrous silver(I) fluoride is not appreciably photosensitive, although the dihydrate is. With this and the material's solubility in water considered, it is unsurprising that it has found little application in photography but may have been one of the salts used by Levi Hill in his "heliochromy", although a US patent for an experimental AgF-based method was granted in 1970.

=== Solubility ===
Unlike the other silver halides, AgF is highly soluble in water (1800 g/L), and it even has some solubility in acetonitrile. Like the alkali metal fluorides, it dissolves in hydrogen fluoride to give a conducting solution.

== Applications ==
=== Organic synthesis ===
Silver(I) fluoride finds application in organofluorine chemistry for addition of fluoride across multiple bonds. For example, AgF adds to perfluoroalkenes in acetonitrile to give perfluoroalkylsilver(I) derivatives. It can also be used as a desulfuration-fluorination reagent on thiourea derived substrates. Due to its high solubility in water and organic solvents, it is a convenient source of fluoride ions, and can be used to fluorinate alkyl halides under mild conditions. An example is given by the following reaction:

Another organic synthetic method using silver(I) fluoride is the BINAP-AgF complex catalyzed enantioselective protonation of silyl enol ethers:

=== Inorganic synthesis ===
The reaction of silver acetylide with a concentrated solution of silver(I) fluoride results in the formation of a chandelier-like [Ag_{10}]^{2+} cluster with endohedral acetylenediide.

Tetralkylammonium fluorides can be conveniently prepared in the laboratory by the reaction of the tetralkylammonium bromide with an aqueous AgF solution.

=== Other ===
It is possible to coat a silicon surface with a uniform silver microlayer (0.1 to 1 μm thickness) by passing AgF vapour over it at 60–800 °C. The relevant reaction is:

4 AgF + Si → 4 Ag + SiF_{4}

Multiple studies have shown silver(I) fluoride to be an effective anti-caries agent, although the mechanism is the subject of current research. Treatment is typically by the "atraumatic" method, in which 40% by mass aqueous silver(I) fluoride solution is applied to carious lesions, followed by sealing of the dentine with glass ionomer cement. Although the treatment is generally recognised to be safe, fluoride toxicity has been a significant clinical concern in paediatric applications, especially as some commercial preparations have had considerable silver(II) fluoride contamination in the past. Due to the instability of concentrated AgF solutions, silver diammine fluoride (Ag(NH_{3})_{2}F) is now more commonly used. Preparation is by the addition of ammonia to aqueous silver fluoride solution or by the dissolution of silver fluoride in aqueous ammonia.
