= Silver fluoride =

Silver fluoride can refer to:

- Silver subfluoride (disilver monofluoride), Ag_{2}F
- Silver(I) fluoride (silver monofluoride, argentous fluoride), AgF
- Silver(I,II) fluorides (disilver trifluoride, trisilver tetrafluoride) Ag_{2}F_{3}, Ag_{3}F_{4}
- Silver(II) fluoride (silver difluoride, argentic fluoride), AgF_{2}
- Silver(II,III) fluorides (disilver pentafluoride, trisilver octafluoride) Ag_{2}F_{5}, Ag_{3}F_{8}
- Silver(III) fluoride (silver trifluoride), AgF_{3}
- Silver diammine fluoride, a material used to stop dental caries (cavities), AgFH_{6}N_{2}

== Gallery ==
Silver fluorides
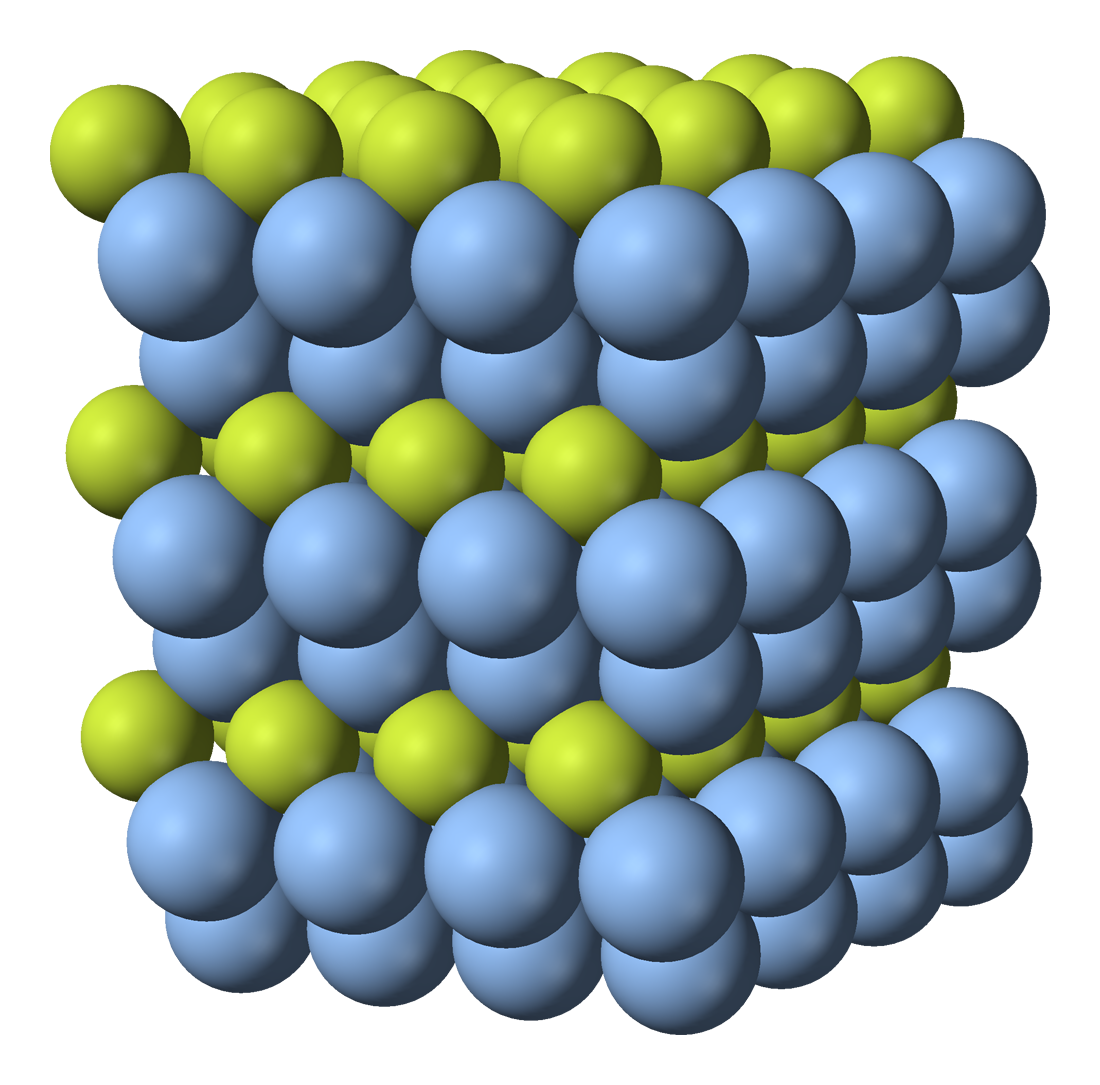
Crystal structure of silver subfluoride.

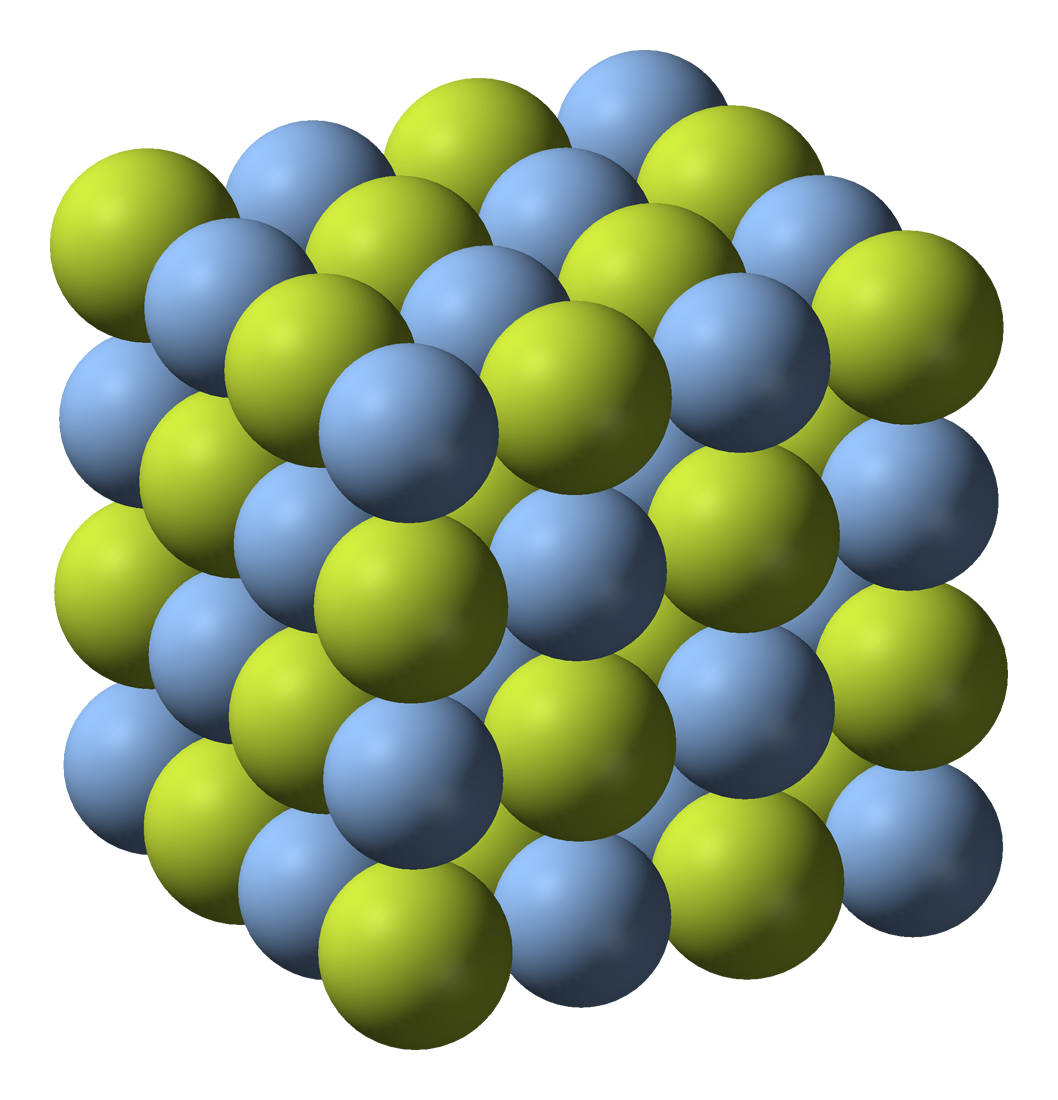
Crystal structure of silver(I) fluoride.

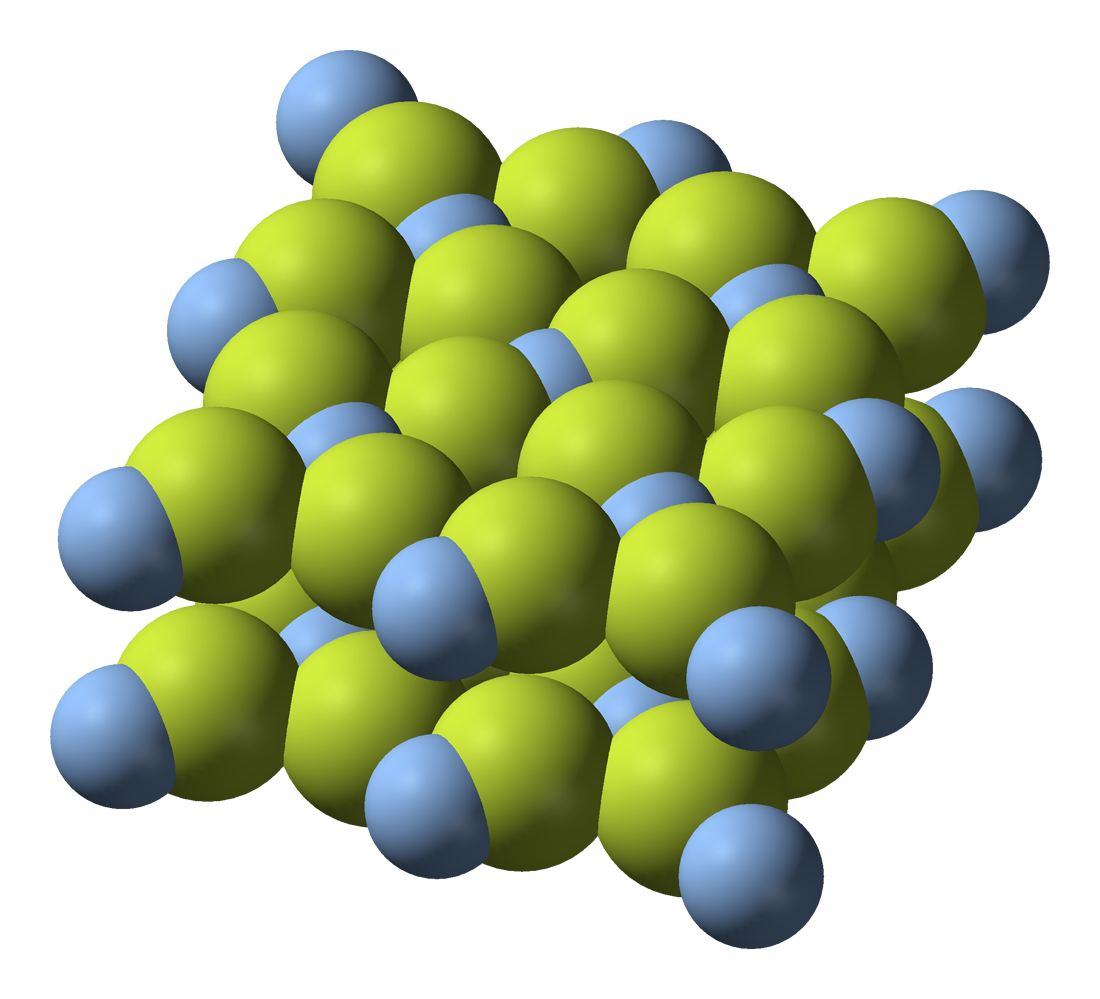
Crystal structure of silver(II) fluoride.
