= Alazan (rocket) =

Was a Cold War-era, 82mm Soviet rocket

The Alazan rocket was a Cold War-era, 82mm Soviet rocket originally developed to distribute cloud seeding chemicals such as potassium or silver iodide. Some were converted into improvised munitions and modified to carry explosive warheads. Others were retrofitted with a warhead, which, in one case, contained up to 400g of radioactive caesium-137 and strontium-90. Both types were acquired by militants following the Soviet collapse.
