= Chlorargyrite =

Mineral form of silver chloride

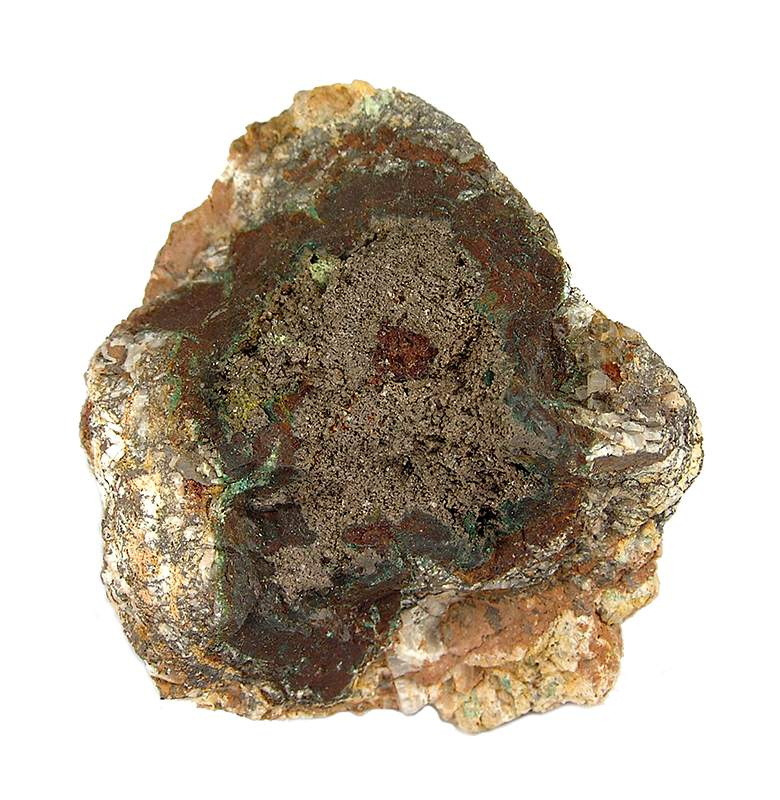

General
- Category: Halide
- Formula: AgCl
- IMA symbol: Cag
- Strunz classification: 3.AA.15
- Crystal system: Isometric
- Crystal class: Hexoctahedral (m3̅m); H-M symbol (4/m 3̅ 2/m)
- Space group: Fm3̅m

Identification
- Color: Colorless when fresh; alters to bright chartreuse-green, light yellow, light green, grey, violet-brown on exposure to light
- Crystal habit: Massive to columnar
- Fracture: Irregular/uneven, sub-conchoidal
- Tenacity: Sectile
- Mohs scale hardness: 1.5–2.5
- Luster: Adamantine, resinous, waxy
- Streak: White
- Specific gravity: 5.556
- Optical properties: Isotropic
- Refractive index: n = 2.071

Chlorargyrite is the mineral form of silver chloride (AgCl). Chlorargyrite occurs as a secondary mineral phase in the oxidation of silver mineral deposits. It crystallizes in the isometric–hexoctahedral crystal class. Typically massive to columnar in occurrence it also has been found as colorless to variably yellow cubic crystals. The color changes to brown or purple on exposure to light. It is quite soft with a Mohs hardness of 1 to 2 and dense with a specific gravity of 5.55. It is also known as cerargyrite and, when weathered by desert air, as horn silver. Bromian chlorargyrite (or embolite) is also common. Chlorargyrite is water-insoluble.

It occurs associated with native silver, cerussite, iodargyrite, atacamite, malachite, jarosite and various iron–manganese oxides.

It was first described in 1875 for occurrences in the Broken Hill district, New South Wales, Australia. The rich Bridal Chamber deposit at Lake Valley, Sierra County, New Mexico was almost pure chlorargyrite. The name is from the Greek, chloros for "pale green" and Latin for silver, argentum.

== See also ==
- Bromargyrite
- Iodargyrite
