= Silver bromide =

Silver Bromide
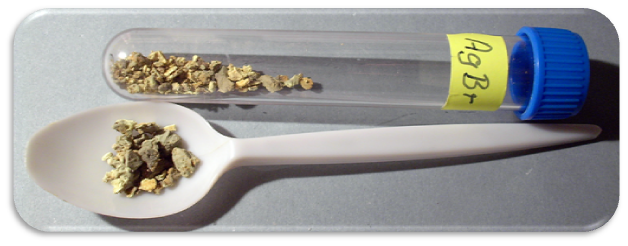

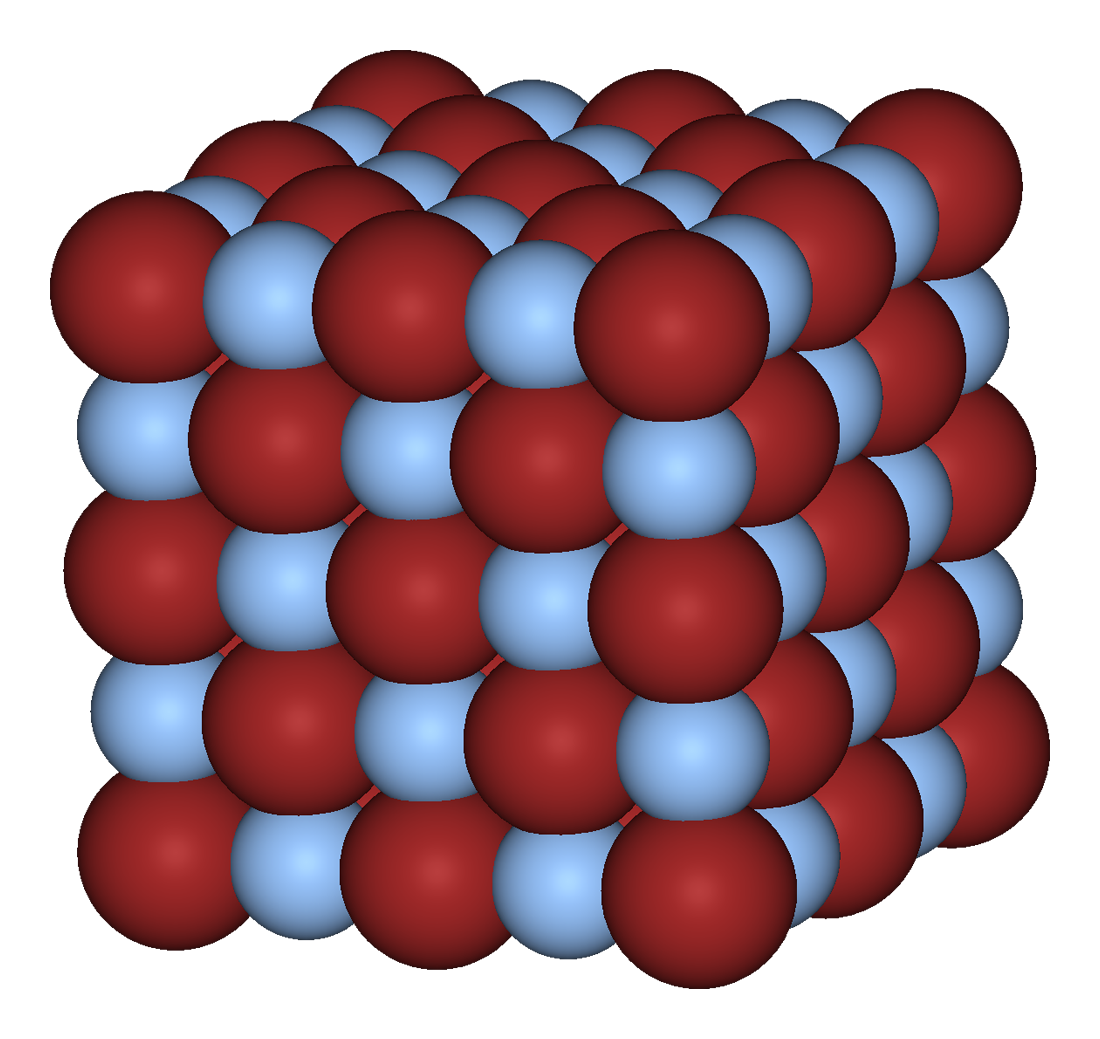

Names
- Other names bromargyrite bromyrite silver(I) bromide

Identifiers
CAS Number	7785-23-1
3D model (JSmol)	Interactive image
ChemSpider	59584
ECHA InfoCard	100.029.160
UNII	NHQ37BJZ2Z
CompTox Dashboard (EPA)	DTXSID4064844
- InChI: InChI=1S/Ag.BrH/h;1H/q+1;/p-1 Key: ADZWSOLPGZMUMY-UHFFFAOYSA-M; InChI=1/Ag.BrH/h;1H/q+1;/p-1 Key: ADZWSOLPGZMUMY-REWHXWOFAK
- SMILES: [Ag]Br

Properties
Chemical formula	AgBr
Molar mass	187.77 g/mol
Appearance	Pale yellow solid photosensitive
Density	6.473 g/cm^{3}, solid
Melting point	432 °C (810 °F; 705 K)
Boiling point	1,502 °C (2,736 °F; 1,775 K) (decomposes)
Solubility in water	0.140 mg/L (20 °C)
Solubility product (K_{sp})	5.4 × 10 ^{−13}
Solubility	insoluble in alcohol, most acids sparingly soluble in ammonia soluble in alkali cyanide solutions
Band gap	2.5 eV
Electron mobility	4000 cm^{2}/(V·s)
Magnetic susceptibility (χ)	−59.7·10^{−6} cm^{3}/mol
Refractive index (n_{D})	2.253

Thermochemistry
Heat capacity (C)	270 J/(kg·K)
Std molar entropy (S^{⦵}_{298})	107 J·mol^{−1}·K^{−1}
Std enthalpy of formation (Δ_{f}H^{⦵}_{298})	−100 kJ·mol^{−1}

Hazards
NFPA 704 (fire diamond)	0 0 0

Related compounds
Other anions	Silver(I) fluoride Silver chloride Silver iodide
Other cations	Copper(I) bromide Mercury(I) bromide
- Except where otherwise noted, data are given for materials in their standard state (at 25 °C [77 °F], 100 kPa). verify (what is ?) Infobox references

Silver bromide (AgBr), a soft, pale-yellow, water-insoluble salt well known (along with other silver halides) for its unusual sensitivity to light. This property has allowed silver halides to become the basis of modern photographic materials. AgBr is widely used in photographic films and is believed by some to have been used for faking the Shroud of Turin. The salt can be found naturally as the mineral bromargyrite (bromyrite).

== Properties ==
=== Solubility ===
The silver halides have a wide range of solubilities. The solubility of AgF is about 6 × 10^{7} times that of AgI. These differences are attributed to the relative solvation enthalpies of the halide ions; the enthalpy of solvation of fluoride is anomalously large.

Silver halide solubilities
Compound	Solubility (g / 100 g H_{2}O)
AgF	172
AgCl	0.00019
AgBr	0.000014
AgI	0.000003

=== Photosensitivity ===
Although photographic processes have been in development since the mid-1800s, there were no suitable theoretical explanations until 1938 with the publication of a paper by R.W. Gurney and N.F. Mott. This paper triggered a large amount of research in fields of solid-state chemistry and physics, as well more specifically in silver halide photosensitivity phenomena.

Further research into this mechanism revealed that the photographic properties of silver halides (in particular AgBr) were a result of deviations from an ideal crystal structure. Factors such as crystal growth, impurities, and surface defects all affect concentrations of point ionic defects and electronic traps, which affect the sensitivity to light and allow for the formation of a latent image.

==== Frenkel defects and quadropolar deformation ====
The major defect in silver halides is the Frenkel defect, where silver ions are located interstitially (Ag_{i}^{+}) in high concentration with their corresponding negatively charged silver-ion vacancies (Ag_{v}^{−}). What is unique about AgBr Frenkel pairs is that the interstitial Ag_{i}^{+} are exceptionally mobile, and that its concentration in the layer below the grain surface (called the space-charge layer) far exceeds that of the intrinsic bulk. The formation energy of the Frenkel pair is low at 1.16 eV, and the migration activation energy is unusually low at 0.05 eV (compare to NaCl: 2.18 eV for the formation of a Schottky pair and 0.75 eV for cationic migration). These low energies result in large defect concentrations, which can reach near 1% near the melting point.

The low activation energy in silver bromide can be attributed the silver ions' high quadrupolar polarizability; that is, it can easily deform from a sphere into an ellipsoid. This property, a result of the d^{9} electronic configuration of the silver ion, facilitates migration in both the silver ion and in silver-ion vacancies, thus giving the unusually low migration energy (for Ag_{v}^{−}: 0.29–0.33 eV, compared to 0.65 eV for NaCl).

Studies have demonstrated that the defect concentrations are strongly affected (up to several powers of 10) by crystal size. Most defects, such as interstitial silver ion concentration and surface kinks, are inversely proportional to crystal size, although vacancy defects are directly proportional. This phenomenon is attributed to changes in the surface chemistry equilibrium, and thus affects each defect concentration differently.

Impurity concentrations can be controlled by crystal growth or direct addition of impurities to the crystal solutions. Although impurities in the silver bromide lattice are necessary to encourage Frenkel defect formation, studies by Hamilton have shown that above a specific concentration of impurities, the numbers of defects of interstitial silver ions and positive kinks reduce sharply by several orders of magnitude. After this point, only silver-ion vacancy defects, which actually increase by several orders of magnitude, are prominent.

==== Electron traps and hole traps ====
When light is incident on the silver halide grain surface, a photoelectron is generated when a halide loses its electron to the conduction band:

X^{−} + hν → X + e^{−}

After the electron is released, it will combine with an interstitial Ag_{i}^{+} to create a silver metal atom Ag_{i}^{0}:

e^{−} + Ag_{i}^{+} → Ag_{i}^{0}

Through the defects in the crystal, the electron is able to reduce its energy and become trapped in the atom. The extent of grain boundaries and defects in the crystal affect the lifetime of the photoelectron, where crystals with a large concentration of defects will trap an electron much faster than a purer crystal.

When a photoelectron is mobilized, a photohole h• is also formed, which also needs to be neutralized. The lifetime of a photohole, however, does not correlate with that of a photoelectron. This detail suggests a different trapping mechanism; Malinowski suggests that the hole traps may be related to defects as a result of impurities. Once trapped, the holes attract mobile, negatively charged defects in the lattice: the interstitial silver vacancy Ag_{v}^{−}:

h• + Ag_{v}^{−} ⇌ h.Ag_{v}

The formation of the h.Ag_{v} lowers its energy sufficiently to stabilize the complex and reduce the probability of ejection of the hole back into the valance band (the equilibrium constant for hole-complex in the interior of the crystal is estimated at 10^{−4}.

Additional investigations on electron- and hole-trapping demonstrated that impurities also can be a significant trapping system. Consequently, interstitial silver ions may not be reduced. Therefore, these traps are actually loss mechanisms, and are considered trapping inefficiencies. For example, atmospheric oxygen can interact with photoelectrons to form an O_{2}^{−} species, which can interact with a hole to reverse the complex and undergo recombination. Metal ion impurities such as copper(I), iron(II), and cadmium(II) have demonstrated hole-trapping in silver bromide.

==== Crystal surface chemistry ====
Once the hole-complexes are formed, they diffuse to the surface of the grain as a result of the formed concentration gradient. Studies demonstrated that the lifetimes of holes near the surface of the grain are much longer than those in the bulk, and that these holes are in equilibrium with adsorbed bromine. The net effect is an equilibrium push at the surface to form more holes. Therefore, as the hole-complexes reach the surface, they disassociate:

h.Ag_{v}^{−} → h• + Ag_{v}^{−} → Br → FRACTION Br_{2}

By this reaction equilibrium, the hole-complexes are constantly consumed at the surface, which acts as a sink, until removed from the crystal. This mechanism provides the counterpart to the reduction of the interstitial Ag_{i}^{+} to Ag_{i}^{0}, giving an overall equation of:

AgBr → Ag + FRACTION Br_{2}

==== Latent image formation and photography ====
Now that some of the theory has been presented, the actual mechanism of the photographic process can be discussed. To summarize, as a photographic film is subjected to an image, photons incident on the grain produce electrons which interact to yield silver metal. More photons hitting a particular grain will produce a larger concentration of silver atoms, containing between 5 and 50 silver atoms (out of ~10^{12} atoms), depending on the sensitivity of the emulsion. The film now has a concentration gradient of silver atom specks based upon varying intensity light across its area, producing an invisible "latent image".

While this process is occurring, bromine atoms are being produced at the surface of the crystal. To collect the bromine, a layer on top of the emulsion, called a sensitizer, acts as a bromine acceptor.

During film development the latent image is intensified by addition of a chemical, typically hydroquinone, that selectivity reduces those grains which contain atoms of silver. The process, which is sensitive to temperature and concentration, will completely reduce grains to silver metal, intensifying the latent image on the order of 10^{10} to 10^{11}. This step demonstrates the advantage and superiority of silver halides over other systems: the latent image, which takes only milliseconds to form and is invisible, is sufficient to produce a full image from it.

After development, the film is "fixed", during which the remaining silver salts are removed to prevent further reduction, leaving the "negative" image on the film. The agent used is sodium thiosulfate, and reacts according to the following equation:

AgX(s) + 2 Na_{2}S_{2}O_{3}(aq) → Na_{3}[Ag(S_{2}O_{3})_{2}](aq) + NaX(aq)

An indefinite number of positive prints can be generated from the negative by passing light through it and undertaking the same steps outlined above.

=== Semiconductor properties ===
As silver bromide is heated within 100 °C of its melting point, an Arrhenius plot of the ionic conductivity shows the value increasing and "upward-turning". Other physical properties such as elastic moduli, specific heat, and the electronic energy gap also increase, suggesting the crystal is approaching instability. This behavior, typical of a semi-conductor, is attributed to a temperature-dependence of Frenkel defect formation, and, when normalized against the concentration of Frenkel defects, the Arrhenius plot linearizes.

== Structure ==
AgF, AgCl, and AgBr all have face-centered cubic (fcc) rock-salt (NaCl) lattice structure with the following lattice parameters:

Silver halide lattice properties
Compound	Crystal	Structure	Lattice, a /Å
AgF	fcc	rock-salt, NaCl	4.936
AgCl, Chlorargyrite	fcc	rock-salt, NaCl	5.5491
AgBr, Bromargyrite	fcc	rock-salt, NaCl	5.7745
Unit cell structure: face-centered cubic / rock-salt structure

The larger halide ions are arranged in a cubic close-packing, while the smaller silver ions fill the octahedral gaps between them, giving a 6-coordinate structure where a silver ion Ag^{+} is surrounded by 6 Br^{−} ions, and vice versa. The coordination geometry for AgBr in the NaCl structure is unexpected for Ag(I) which typically forms linear, trigonal (3-coordinated Ag) or tetrahedral (4-coordinated Ag) complexes.

Unlike the other silver halides, iodargyrite (AgI) contains a hexagonal zincite lattice structure.

== Preparation ==
Although the compound can be found in mineral form, AgBr is typically prepared by the reaction of silver nitrate with an alkali bromide, typically potassium bromide:

AgNO_{3}(aq) + KBr(aq) → AgBr(s)+ KNO_{3}(aq)

Although less convenient, the salt can also be prepared directly from its elements.

Modern preparation of a simple, light-sensitive surface involves forming an emulsion of silver halide crystals in a gelatine, which is then coated onto a film or other support. The crystals are formed by precipitation in a controlled environment to produce small, uniform crystals (typically < 1 μm in diameter and containing ~10^{12} Ag atoms) called grains.

== Reactions ==
Silver bromide reacts readily with liquid ammonia to generate a variety of ammine complexes, like Ag(NH_{3})_{2}Br and Ag(NH_{3})_{2}Br^{−}_{2}. In general:

AgBr + m NH_{3} + (n - 1) Br^{−} → Ag(NH_{3})_{m}Br^{1-n}_{n}

Silver bromide reacts with triphenylphosphine to give a tris(triphenylphosphine) product:

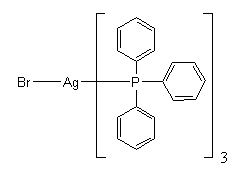

== See also ==
- Photography
- Science of photography
- Silver chloride
