= Copper(I) fluoride =

Names
- IUPAC name Copper(I) fluoride
- Systematic IUPAC name Fluorocopper
- Other names Cuprous fluoride

Identifiers
CAS Number	13478-41-6
3D model (JSmol)	Interactive image; Interactive image
ChemSpider	2341261
PubChem CID	3084153
CompTox Dashboard (EPA)	DTXSID50158944
- InChI: InChI=1S/Cu.FH/h;1H/q+1;/p-1 Key: BMRUOURRLCCWHB-UHFFFAOYSA-M; InChI=1/Cu.FH/h;1H/q+1;/p-1 Key: BMRUOURRLCCWHB-REWHXWOFAQ
- SMILES: F[Cu]; [Cu]F

Properties
Chemical formula	CuF
Molar mass	82.544 g·mol^{−1}

Related compounds
Other anions	Copper(I) chloride Copper(I) bromide Copper(I) iodide
Other cations	Silver(I) fluoride Gold(I) fluoride
Related compounds	Copper(II) fluoride
- Except where otherwise noted, data are given for materials in their standard state (at 25 °C [77 °F], 100 kPa). verify (what is ?) Infobox references

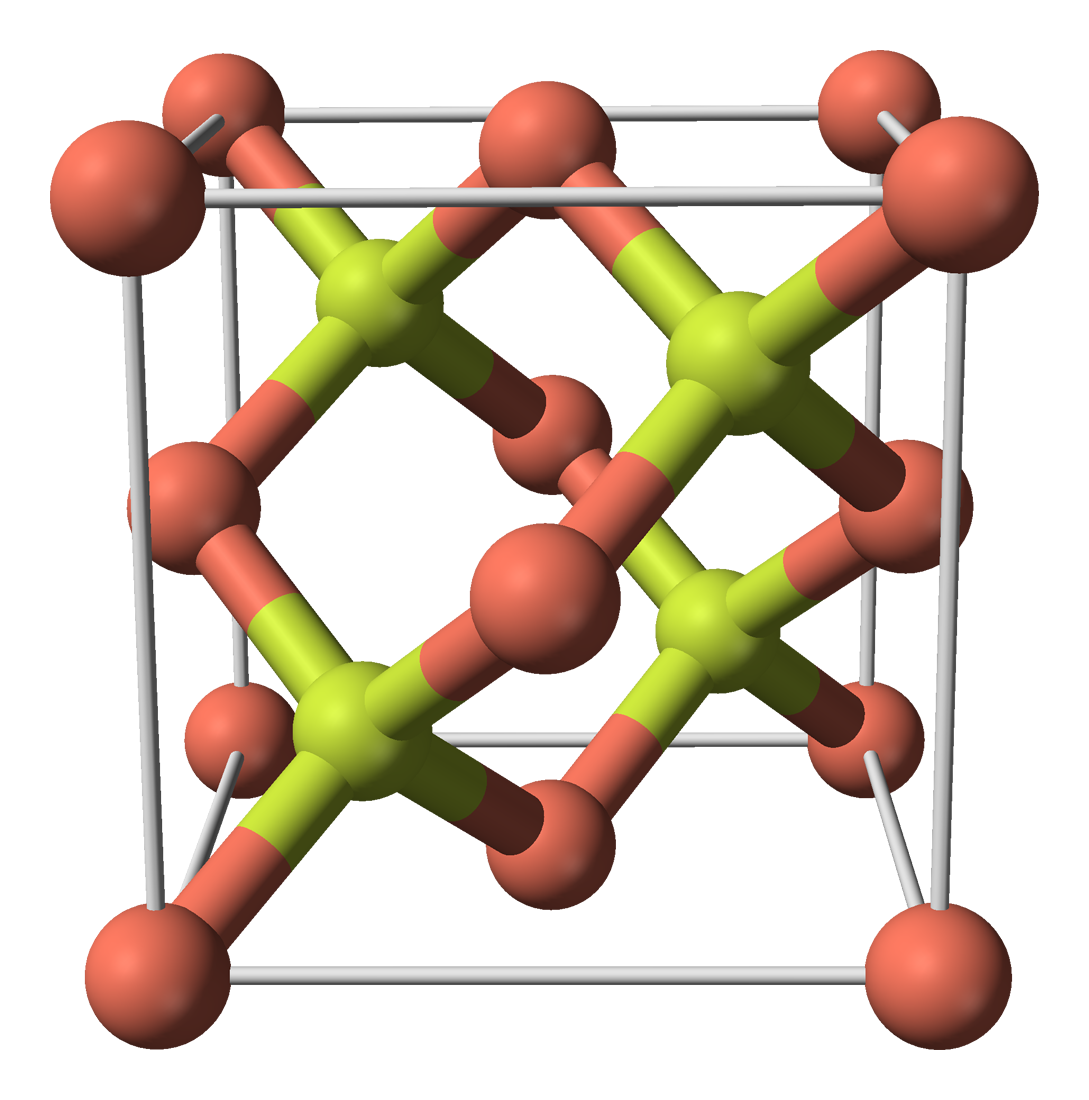
Ball-and-stick model of the unit cell of copper(I) fluoride, CuF

Copper(I) fluoride or cuprous fluoride is an inorganic compound with the chemical formula CuF. Its existence is uncertain. It was reported in 1933 to have a sphalerite-type crystal structure. Modern textbooks state that CuF is not known, since fluorine is so electronegative that it will always oxidise copper to its +2 oxidation state. Complexes of CuF such as [(Ph_{3}P)_{3}CuF] are, however, known and well characterised.

== Synthesis and reactivity ==
Unlike other copper(I) halides like copper(I) chloride, copper(I) fluoride tends to disproportionate into copper(II) fluoride and copper in a one-to-one ratio at ambient conditions, unless it is stabilised through complexation as in the example of [Cu(N_{2})F].

2CuF → Cu + CuF_{2}

== See also ==
- Copper(II) fluoride, the other simple fluoride of copper
