= Silver chloride =

Chemical compound with the formula AgCl

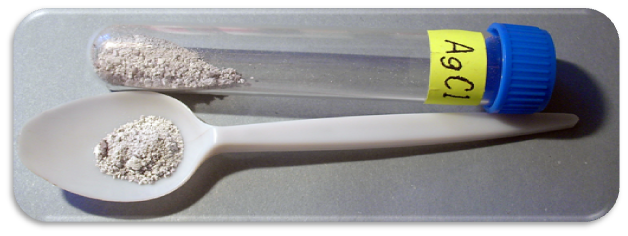

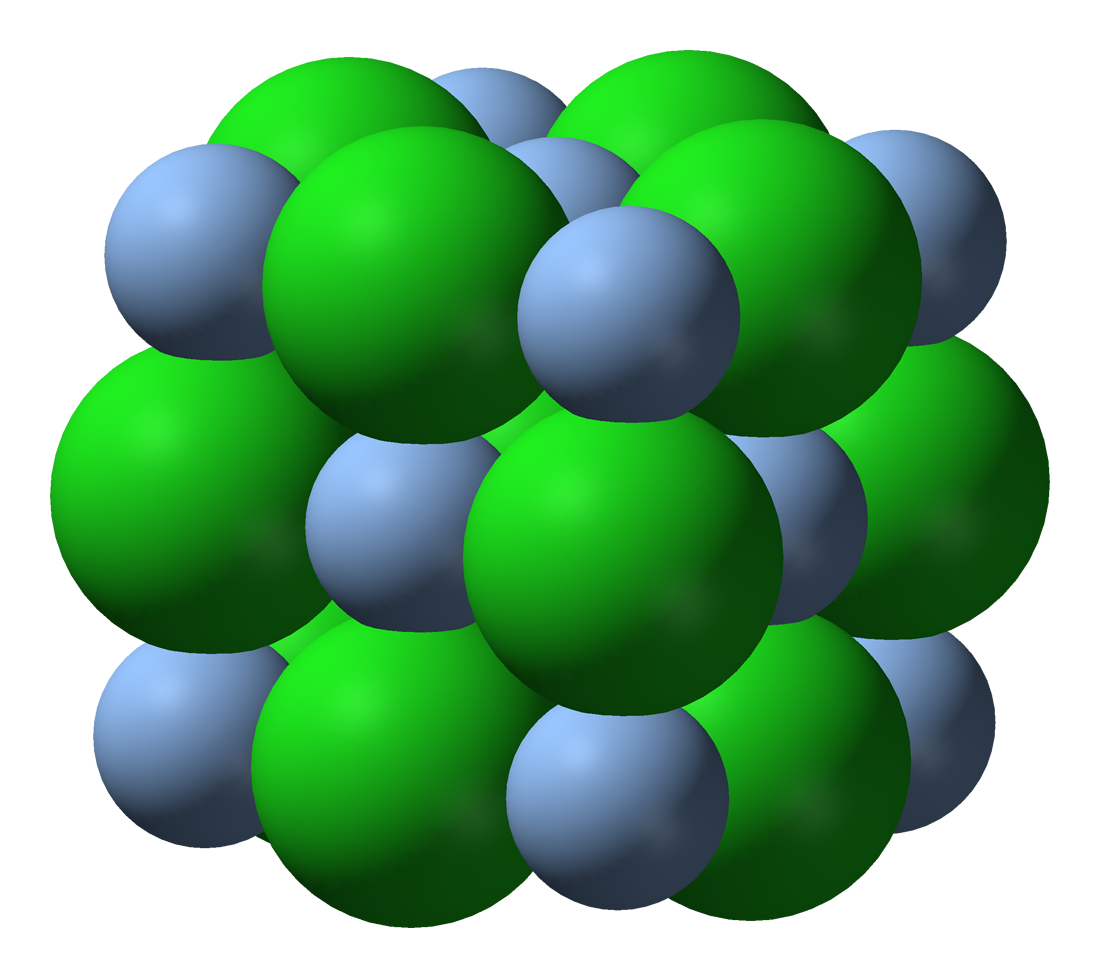

Names
- IUPAC name Silver(I) chloride
- Other names Cerargyrite; Chlorargyrite; Horn silver Argentous chloride

Identifiers
CAS Number	7783-90-6
3D model (JSmol)	Interactive image
ChEBI	CHEBI:30341
ChemSpider	22967
ECHA InfoCard	100.029.121
PubChem CID	24561
RTECS number	VW3563000
UNII	MWB0804EO7
CompTox Dashboard (EPA)	DTXSID4035251
- InChI: InChI=1S/Ag.ClH/h;1H/q+1;/p-1 Key: HKZLPVFGJNLROG-UHFFFAOYSA-M; InChI=1S/Ag.ClH/h;1H/q+1;/p-1; Key: HKZLPVFGJNLROG-UHFFFAOYSA-M
- SMILES: Cl[Ag]

Properties
Chemical formula	AgCl
Molar mass	143.32 g·mol^{−1}
Appearance	White solid
Density	5.56 g cm^{−3}
Melting point	455 °C (851 °F; 728 K)
Boiling point	1,547 °C (2,817 °F; 1,820 K)
Solubility in water	520 μg/100 g at 50 °C
Solubility product (K_{sp})	1.77×10^{−10}
Solubility	soluble in NH_{3}, conc. HCl, conc. H_{2}SO_{4}, alkali cyanide, (NH_{4})_{2}CO_{3}, KBr, Na_{2}S_{2}O_{3}; insoluble in alcohol, dilute acids.
Magnetic susceptibility (χ)	−49.0·10^{−6} cm^{3}/mol
Refractive index (n_{D})	2.071

Structure
Crystal structure	cubic
Space group	Fm3̅m (No. 225)
Lattice constant	a = 555 pm
Coordination geometry	Octahedral

Thermochemistry
Std molar entropy (S^{⦵}_{298})	96 J·mol^{−1}·K^{−1}
Std enthalpy of formation (Δ_{f}H^{⦵}_{298})	−127 kJ·mol^{−1}

Hazards
NFPA 704 (fire diamond)	2 0 0
Safety data sheet (SDS)	Fischer Scientific, Salt Lake Metals

Related compounds
Other anions	silver(I) fluoride, silver bromide, silver iodide
- Except where otherwise noted, data are given for materials in their standard state (at 25 °C [77 °F], 100 kPa). verify (what is ?) Infobox references

Silver chloride is an inorganic chemical compound with the chemical formula AgCl. This white crystalline solid is well known for its low solubility in water and its sensitivity to light. Upon illumination or heating, silver chloride converts to silver (and chlorine), which is signaled by grey to black or purplish coloration in some samples. AgCl occurs naturally as the mineral chlorargyrite.

It is produced by a metathesis reaction for use in photography and in pH meters as electrodes.

== Preparation ==
Silver chloride is unusual in that, unlike most chloride salts, it has very low solubility. It is easily synthesized by metathesis: combining an aqueous solution of silver nitrate (which is soluble) with a soluble chloride salt, such as sodium chloride (which is used industrially as a method of producing AgCl), or cobalt(II) chloride. The silver chloride that forms will precipitate immediately.

AgNO_{3} + NaCl → AgCl↓ + NaNO_{3}
2 AgNO_{3} + CoCl_{2} → 2 AgCl↓ + Co(NO_{3})_{2}

It can also be produced by the reaction of silver metal and aqua regia; however, the insolubility of silver chloride decelerates the reaction. Silver chloride is also a by-product of the Miller process, where silver metal is reacted with chlorine gas at elevated temperatures.

== History ==
Silver chloride has been known since ancient times. Ancient Egyptians produced it as a method of refining silver, which was done by roasting silver ores with salt to produce silver chloride, which was subsequently decomposed to silver and chlorine. However, it was later identified as a distinct compound of silver in 1565 by Georg Fabricius. Silver chloride, historically known as luna cornea (which could be translated as "horn silver" as the moon was an alchemic codename for silver), has also been an intermediate in other historical silver refining processes. One such example is the Augustin process developed in 1843, wherein copper ore containing small amounts of silver is roasted in chloridizing conditions and the silver chloride produced is leached by brine, where it is more soluble.

Silver-based photographic films were first made in 1727 by Johann Heinrich Schulze with silver nitrate. However, he was not successful in making permanent images, as they faded away. Later in 1816, the use of silver chloride was introduced into photography by Nicéphore Niépce.

== Structure ==
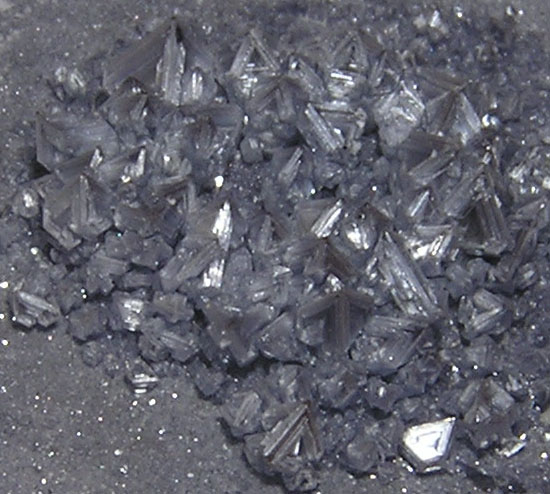
Pyramidal crystals of AgCl

The solid adopts the fcc NaCl structure, in which each Ag^{+} ion is surrounded by an octahedron of six chloride ligands. AgF and AgBr crystallize similarly. However, the crystallography depends on the condition of crystallization, primarily free silver ion concentration, as is shown in the picture to the left (greyish tint and metallic lustre are due to partially reduced silver).

Above 7.5 GPa, silver chloride transitions into a monoclinic KOH phase. Then at 11 GPa, it undergoes another phase change to an orthorhombic TlI phase.

== Reactions ==
AgCl dissolves in solutions containing ligands such as chloride, cyanide, triphenylphosphine, thiosulfate, thiocyanate and ammonia. Silver chloride reacts with these ligands according to the following illustrative equations:

AgCl(s) + 2 CN^{−}(aq) → Ag(CN)_{2}^{−}(aq) + Cl^{−}(aq)

AgCl(s) + 2 S_{2}O_{3}^{2−}(aq) → (Ag(S_{2}O_{3})_{2})^{3−}(aq) + Cl^{−}(aq)

AgCl(s) + 2 NH_{3}(aq) → Ag(NH_{3})_{2}^{+}(aq) + Cl^{−}(aq)

Of these reactions used to leach silver chloride from silver ores, cyanidation is the most commonly used. Cyanidation produces the soluble dicyanoargentate complex, which is later turned back to silver by reduction.

Silver chloride does not react with nitric acid, but instead reacts with sulfuric acid to produce silver sulfate. Then the sulfate is protonated in the presence of sulfuric acid to bisulfate, which can be reversed by dilution. This reaction is used to separate silver from other platinum group metals.

Most complexes derived from AgCl are two-, three-, and, in rare cases, four-coordinate, adopting linear, trigonal planar, and tetrahedral coordination geometries, respectively.

3 AgCl(s) + Na_{3}AsO_{3}(aq) → Ag_{3}AsO_{3}(s) + 3 NaCl(aq)

3 AgCl(s) + Na_{3}AsO_{4}(aq) → Ag_{3}AsO_{4}(s) + 3 NaCl(aq)

These two reactions are particularly important in the qualitative analysis of AgCl in labs as AgCl is white, which changes to Ag_{3}AsO_{3} (silver arsenite) which is yellow, or Ag_{3}AsO_{4} (silver arsenate) which is reddish brown.

== Chemistry ==
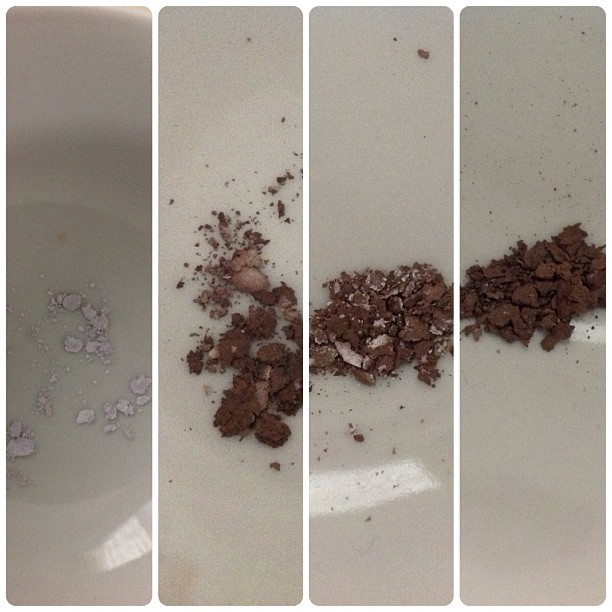
Silver chloride decomposes over time with exposure to UV light

In one of the most famous reactions in chemistry, the addition of colorless aqueous silver nitrate to an equally colorless solution of sodium chloride produces an opaque white precipitate of AgCl:

Ag^{+}(aq) + Cl^{−}(aq) → AgCl(s)

This conversion is a common test for the presence of chloride in solution. Due to its conspicuousness, it is easily used in titration, which gives the typical case of argentometry.

The solubility product, K_{sp}, for AgCl in water is 1.77×10^{−10} at room temperature, which indicates that only 1.9 mg (that is, $\sqrt{1.77\times 10^{-10}} \ \mathrm{mol}$) of AgCl will dissolve per liter of water. The chloride content of an aqueous solution can be determined quantitatively by weighing the precipitated AgCl, which conveniently is non-hygroscopic since AgCl is one of the few transition metal chlorides that are insoluble in water. Interfering ions for this test are bromide and iodide, as well as a variety of ligands (see silver halide).

For AgBr and AgI, the K_{sp} values are 5.2 × 10^{−13} and 8.3 × 10^{−17}, respectively. Silver bromide (slightly yellowish white) and silver iodide (bright yellow) are also significantly more photosensitive than is AgCl.

AgCl quickly darkens on exposure to light by disintegrating into elemental chlorine and metallic silver. This reaction is used in photography and film and is the following:

Cl^{−} + hν → Cl + e^{−} (excitation of the chloride ion, which gives up its extra electron into the conduction band)
Ag^{+} + e^{−} → Ag (liberation of a silver ion, which gains an electron to become a silver atom)

The process is not reversible because the silver atom liberated is typically found at a crystal defect or an impurity site so that the electron's energy is lowered enough that it is "trapped".

== Uses ==
=== Silver chloride electrode ===
Silver chloride is a constituent of the silver chloride electrode which is a common reference electrode in electrochemistry. The electrode functions as a reversible redox electrode and the equilibrium is between the solid silver metal and silver chloride in a chloride solution of a given concentration. It is usually the internal reference electrode in pH meters and it is often used as a reference in reduction potential measurements. As an example of the latter, the silver chloride electrode is the most commonly used reference electrode for testing cathodic protection corrosion control systems in seawater environments.

=== Photography ===
Silver chloride and silver nitrate have been used in photography since it began, and are well known for their light sensitivity. It was also a vital part of the Daguerreotype sensitization where silver plates were fumed with chlorine to produce a thin layer of silver chloride. Another famous process that used silver chloride was the gelatin silver process where embedded silver chloride crystals in gelatin were used to produce images. However, with advances in color photography, these methods of black-and-white photography have dwindled. Even though color photography uses silver chloride, it only works as a mediator for transforming light into organic image dyes.

Other photographic uses include making photographic paper, since it reacts with photons to form latent images via photoreduction; and in photochromic lenses, taking advantage of its reversible conversion to Ag metal. Unlike photography, where the photoreduction is irreversible, the glass prevents the electron from being 'trapped'. These photochromic lenses are used primarily in sunglasses.

=== Antimicrobial agent ===
Silver chloride nanoparticles are widely sold commercially as an antimicrobial agent. The antimicrobial activity of silver chloride depends on the particle size, but are usually below 100 nm. In general, silver chloride is antimicrobial against various bacteria, such as E. coli.

Silver chloride nanoparticles for use as a microbial agent can be produced by a metathesis reaction between aqueous silver and chloride ions or can be biogenically synthesized by fungi and plants.

=== Other uses ===
Silver chloride's low solubility makes it a useful addition to pottery glazes for the production of "Inglaze lustre". Silver chloride has been used as an antidote for mercury poisoning, assisting in the elimination of mercury. Other uses of AgCl include:

- in bandages and wound healing products,
- to create yellow, amber, and brown shades in stained glass manufacture, and
- as an infrared transmissive optical component, as it can be hot-pressed into window and lens shapes.

== Natural occurrence ==
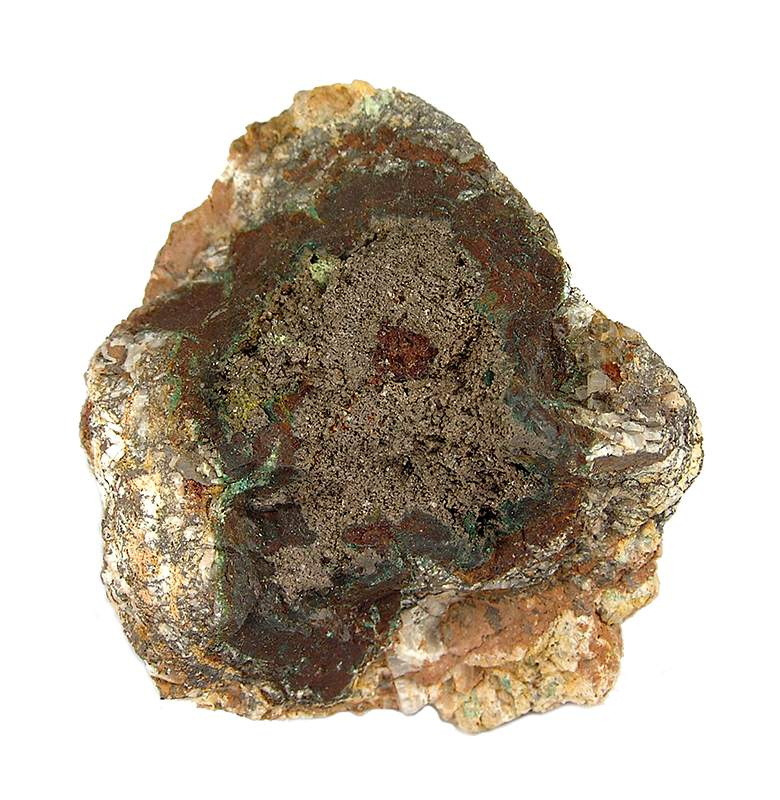
Chlorargyrite

Silver chloride occurs naturally as chlorargyrite in the arid and oxidized zones in silver deposits. If some of the chloride ions are replaced by bromide or iodide ions, the words bromian and iodian are added before the name, respectively. This mineral is a source of silver and is leached by cyanidation, where it will produce the soluble Ag(CN)_{2}^{−} complex.

== Safety ==
According to the ECHA, silver chloride may damage the unborn child, is very toxic to aquatic life with long lasting effects and may be corrosive to metals.

== See also ==
- Photosensitive glass
