= Iodide =

Ion, and compounds containing the ion

Names
- Systematic IUPAC name Iodide

Identifiers
CAS Number	20461-54-5
3D model (JSmol)	Interactive image
Beilstein Reference	3587184
ChEBI	CHEBI:16382
ChEMBL	ChEMBL185537
ChemSpider	28015
Gmelin Reference	14912
KEGG	C00708
PubChem CID	30165
UNII	09G4I6V86Q
- InChI: InChI=1S/HI/h1H/p-1 Key: XMBWDFGMSWQBCA-UHFFFAOYSA-M
- SMILES: [I-]

Properties
Chemical formula	I^{−}
Molar mass	126.90447 g·mol^{−1}
Conjugate acid	Hydrogen iodide

Thermochemistry
Std molar entropy (S^{⦵}_{298})	169.26 J K^{−1} mol^{−1}

Related compounds
Other anions	Fluoride; Chloride; Bromide
- Except where otherwise noted, data are given for materials in their standard state (at 25 °C [77 °F], 100 kPa). Infobox references

An iodide ion is I^{−}. Compounds with iodine in formal oxidation state −1 are called iodides. In everyday life, iodide is most commonly encountered as a component of iodized salt, which many governments mandate. Worldwide, iodine deficiency affects two billion people and is the leading preventable cause of intellectual disability.

== Structure and characteristics of inorganic iodides ==
Iodide is one of the largest monatomic anions. It is assigned a radius of around 206 picometers. For comparison, the lighter halides are considerably smaller: bromide (196 pm), chloride (181 pm), and fluoride (133 pm). In part because of its size, iodide forms relatively weak bonds with most elements.

Most iodide salts are soluble in water, but often less so than the related chlorides and bromides. Iodide, being large, is less hydrophilic compared to the smaller anions. One consequence of this is that sodium iodide is highly soluble in acetone, whereas sodium chloride is not. The low solubility of silver iodide and lead iodide reflects the covalent character of these metal iodides. A test for the presence of iodide ions is the formation of yellow precipitates of these compounds upon treatment of a solution of silver nitrate or lead(II) nitrate.

Aqueous solutions of iodide salts dissolve iodine better than pure water. This effect is due to the formation of the triiodide ion, which is brown:

I^{−} + I_{2} ⇌ I^{−}_{3}

=== Redox, including antioxidant properties ===
Iodide salts are mild reducing agents and many react with oxygen to give iodine. A reducing agent is a chemical term for an antioxidant. Its antioxidant properties can be expressed quantitatively as a redox potential:

2I^{−} ⇌ I_{2} + 2e^{−} E° = 0.54 volts (versus SHE)

Because iodide is easily oxidized, some enzymes readily convert it into electrophilic iodinating agents, as required for the biosynthesis of myriad iodide-containing natural products. Iodide can function as an antioxidant reducing species that can destroy ozone and reactive oxygen species such as hydrogen peroxide:

2 I^{−} + peroxidase + H_{2}O_{2} + tyrosine, histidine, lipid, etc. → iodo-compounds + H_{2}O + 2 e^{−}

== Representative iodides ==
Compound	Formula	Appearance	Use or occurrence
Potassium iodide	KI	white crystals	iodine component of iodized salt
Hydrogen iodide	HI	colourless gas	strong mineral acid
Silver iodide	AgI	yellow powder that darkens in light	photoactive component of silver-based photographic film
Thyroxine (3,5,3′,5′-tetraiodothyronine)	C_{15}H_{11}I_{4}NO_{4}	pale yellow solid	hormone essential for human health

== Natural occurrence ==
Iodargyrite—natural, crystalline silver iodide—is the most common iodide mineral currently known. Iodide anions may sometimes also be found combined with mercury, copper and lead, but minerals with such compositions are even more scarce.

== Other oxoanions ==
Iodine can assume oxidation states of −1, +1, +3, +5, or +7. A number of neutral iodine oxides are also known.

Iodine oxidation state	−1	+1	+3	+5	+7
Name	iodide	hypoiodite	iodite	iodate	periodate
Formula	I^{−}	IO^{−}	IO^{−}_{2}	IO^{−}_{3}	IO^{−}_{4} or IO^{5−}_{6}
