= Copper(II) fluoride =

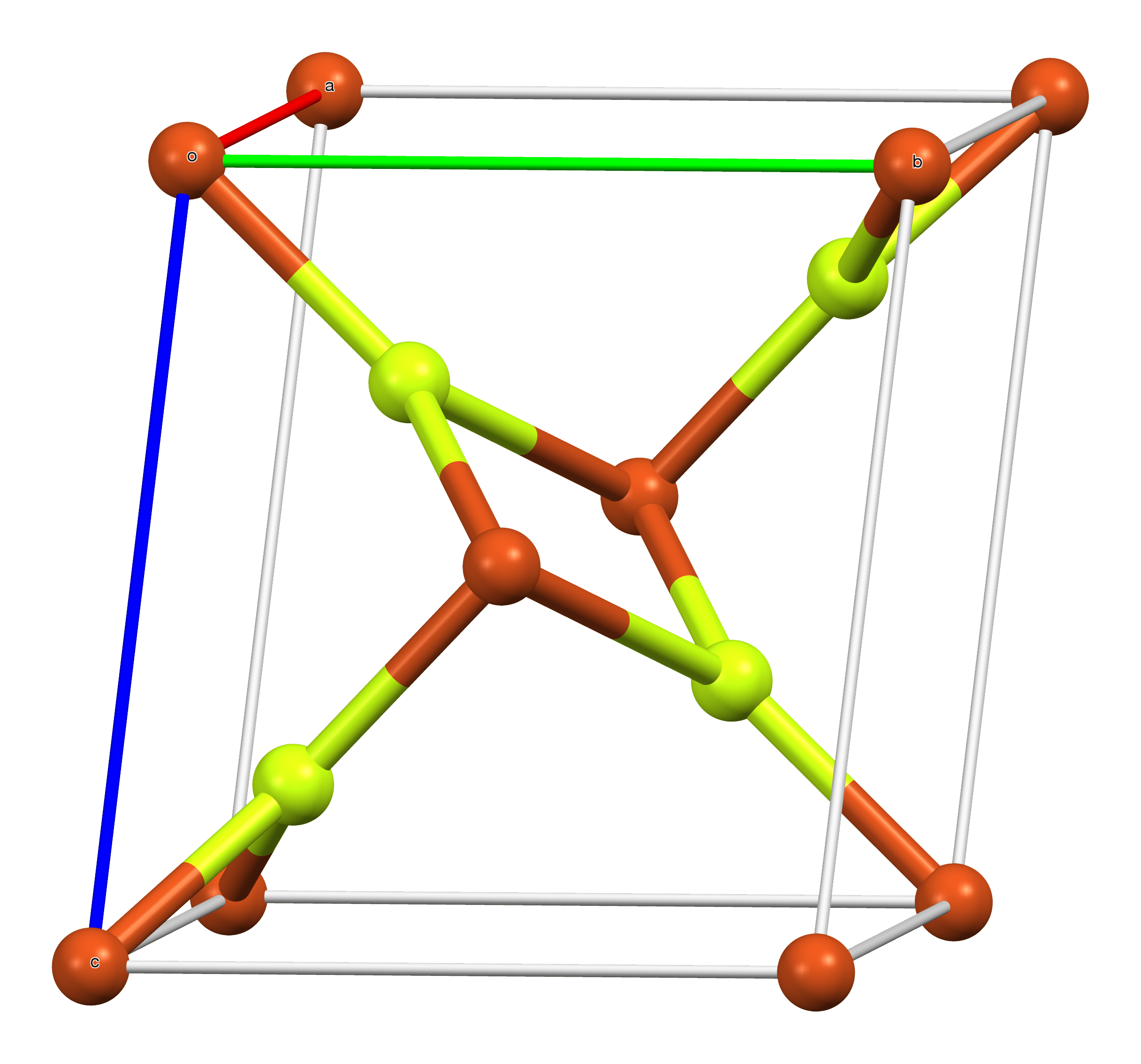
- Ball-and-stick model of the unit cell of copper(II) fluoride Unit cell of the anhydrous form

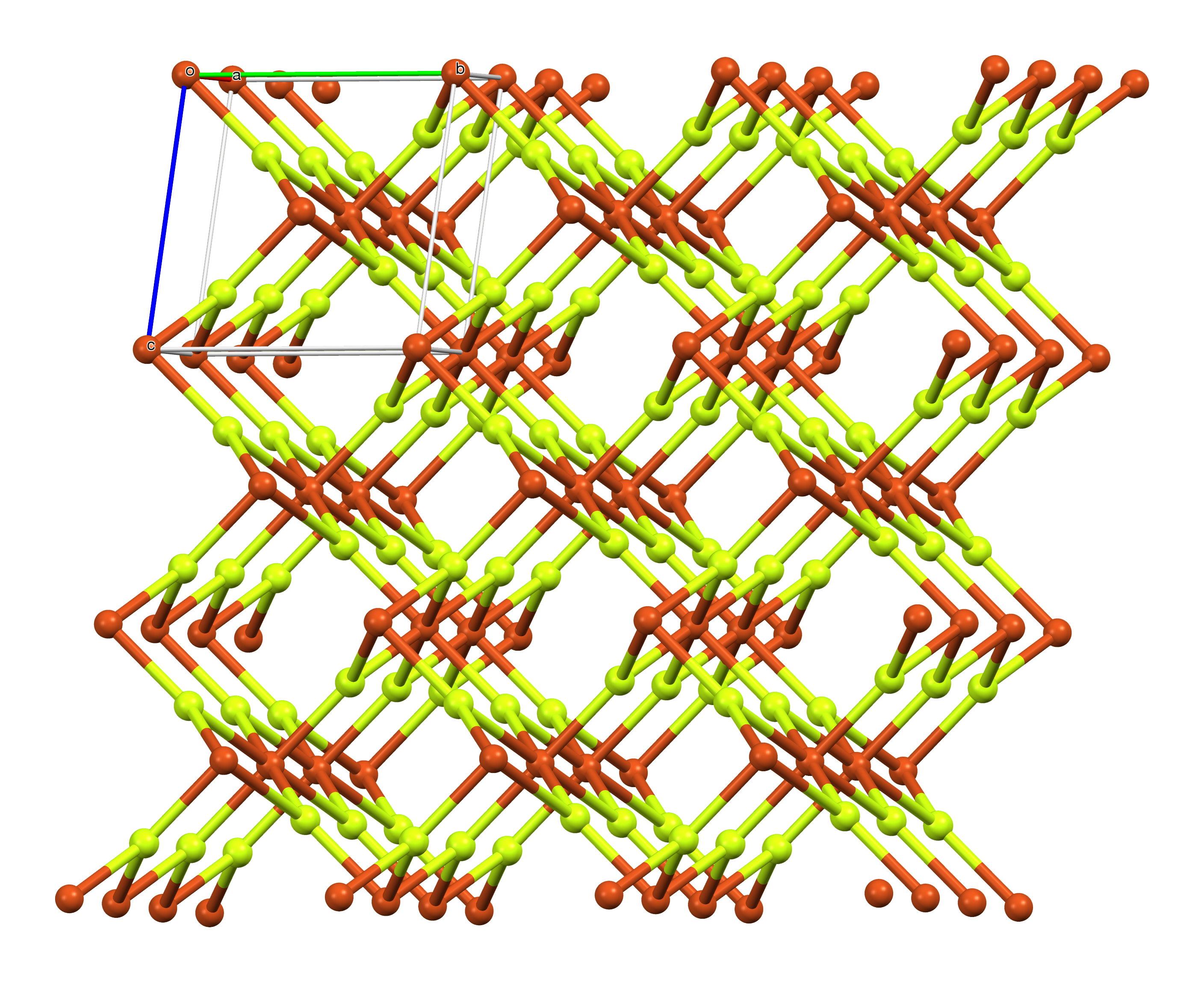
- Ball-and-stick model of packing in the crystal structure of copper(II) fluoride Ball-and-stick model of crystal packing in the anhydrous form

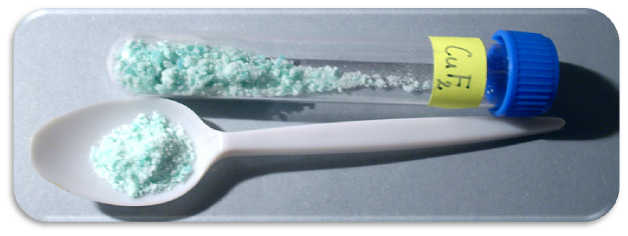
- Actual picture Dihydrate

Names
- IUPAC name Copper difluoride
- Other names Cupric fluoride; Copper fluoride; Copper (2+) Difluoride

Identifiers
CAS Number	7789-19-7; 13454-88-1 (dihydrate)
3D model (JSmol)	Interactive image
ChemSpider	74214
ECHA InfoCard	100.029.225
EC Number	232-147-3
PubChem CID	82236
UNII	ML04XYE5C1; 3A38PC42E9 (dihydrate)
CompTox Dashboard (EPA)	DTXSID80894782
- InChI: InChI=1S/Cu.2FH/h;2*1H/q+2;;/p-2 Key: GWFAVIIMQDUCRA-UHFFFAOYSA-L; InChI=1/Cu.2FH/h;2*1H/q+2;;/p-2 Key: GWFAVIIMQDUCRA-NUQVWONBAF
- SMILES: [Cu+2].[F-].[F-]

Properties
Chemical formula	CuF_{2}
Molar mass	101.543 g/mol (anhydrous); 137.573 g/mol (dihydrate)
Appearance	White crystalline powder When hydrated: Blue
Density	4.23 g/cm^{3} (anhydrous); 2.934 g/cm^{3} (dihydrate)
Melting point	836 °C (1,537 °F; 1,109 K) (anhydrous); 130 °C (dihydrate, decomposes)
Boiling point	1,676 °C (3,049 °F; 1,949 K) (anhydrous)
Magnetic susceptibility (χ)	+1050.0·10^{−6} cm^{3}/mol

Thermochemistry
Std enthalpy of formation (Δ_{f}H^{⦵}_{298})	−267 kJ/mol (−63.8 kcal/mol) (gas)
Enthalpy of fusion (Δ_{f}H^{⦵}_{fus})	54 kJ/mol (13 kcal/mol)
Enthalpy of sublimation (Δ_{f}H_{sublim})	267 kJ/mol (63.9 kcal/mol)

Hazards
- GHS labelling
Pictograms	(GHS05: Corrosive) (GHS07: Exclamation mark)
Signal word	Danger
Hazard statements	H302, H314, H332
Precautionary statements	P260, P264, P270, P271, P280, P301+P330+P331, P303+P361+P353, P304+P340, P305+P351+P338, P310, P363, P405, P501
- NIOSH (US health exposure limits)
PEL (Permissible)	TWA 1 mg/m^{3} (as Cu)
REL (Recommended)	TWA 1 mg/m^{3} (as Cu)
IDLH (Immediate danger)	TWA 100 mg/m^{3} (as Cu)

Related compounds
Other anions	Copper(II) bromide Copper(II) chloride
Other cations	Silver(II) fluoride Cobalt(II) fluoride
Related compounds	Copper(I) fluoride
- Except where otherwise noted, data are given for materials in their standard state (at 25 °C [77 °F], 100 kPa). verify (what is ?) Infobox references

Copper(II) fluoride or cupric fluoride is an inorganic compound with the chemical formula CuF_{2}. The anhydrous form is a white, ionic, crystalline, hygroscopic salt with a distorted rutile-type crystal structure, similar to other fluorides of chemical formulae MF_{2} (where M is a metal). The dihydrate, CuF_{2}·2H_{2}O, is blue in colour.

== Properties ==
Copper(II) fluoride is slightly soluble in water, but starts to decompose in hot water, producing basic F^{−} and Cu(OH)^{+} ions.

== Structure ==
Copper(II) fluoride has a monoclinic crystal structure and cannot achieve a higher-symmetry structure. It forms rectangular prisms with a parallelogram base. Each copper ion has four neighbouring fluoride ions at 1.93 Å separation and two further away at 2.27 Å. This distorted octahedral [4+2] coordination is a consequence of the Jahn–Teller effect in d^{9} copper(II), and leads to a distorted rutile structure similar to that of chromium(II) fluoride, CrF_{2}, which is a d^{4} compound.

Coordination in copper(II) fluoride
Copper coordination	Fluorine coordination

== Synthesis ==
Copper(II) fluoride can be synthesized from copper and fluorine at elevated temperatures. At 500 °C (932 °F) a 53% conversion is achieved.

Cu + F_{2} → CuF_{2}

== Uses ==
Cupric fluoride catalyzes the decomposition of nitric oxides in emission control systems.

Copper(II) fluoride can be used to make fluorinated aromatic hydrocarbons by reacting with aromatic hydrocarbons in an oxygen-containing atmosphere at temperatures above 450 °C (842 °F). This reaction is simpler than the Sandmeyer reaction, but is only effective in making compounds that can survive at the temperature used. A coupled reaction using oxygen and 2 HF regenerates the copper(II) fluoride, producing water. This method has been proposed as a "greener" method of producing fluoroaromatics since it avoids producing toxic waste products such as ammonium fluoride.

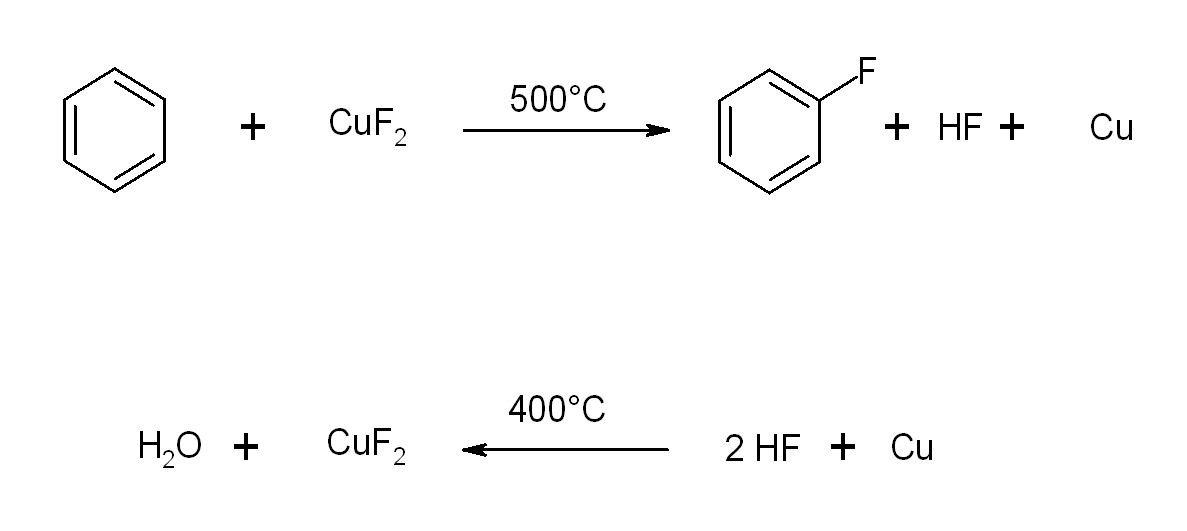

== Reactions ==
It loses fluorine in the molten stage at temperatures above 950 °C (1742 °F).

2 CuF_{2} → 2 CuF + F_{2}

2 CuF → CuF_{2} + Cu

The complex anions CuF_{3}^{−}, CuF_{4}^{2−} and CuF_{6}^{4−} are formed if CuF_{2} is exposed to substances containing fluoride ions F^{−}.
