= Bromargyrite =

Natural mineral form of silver bromide

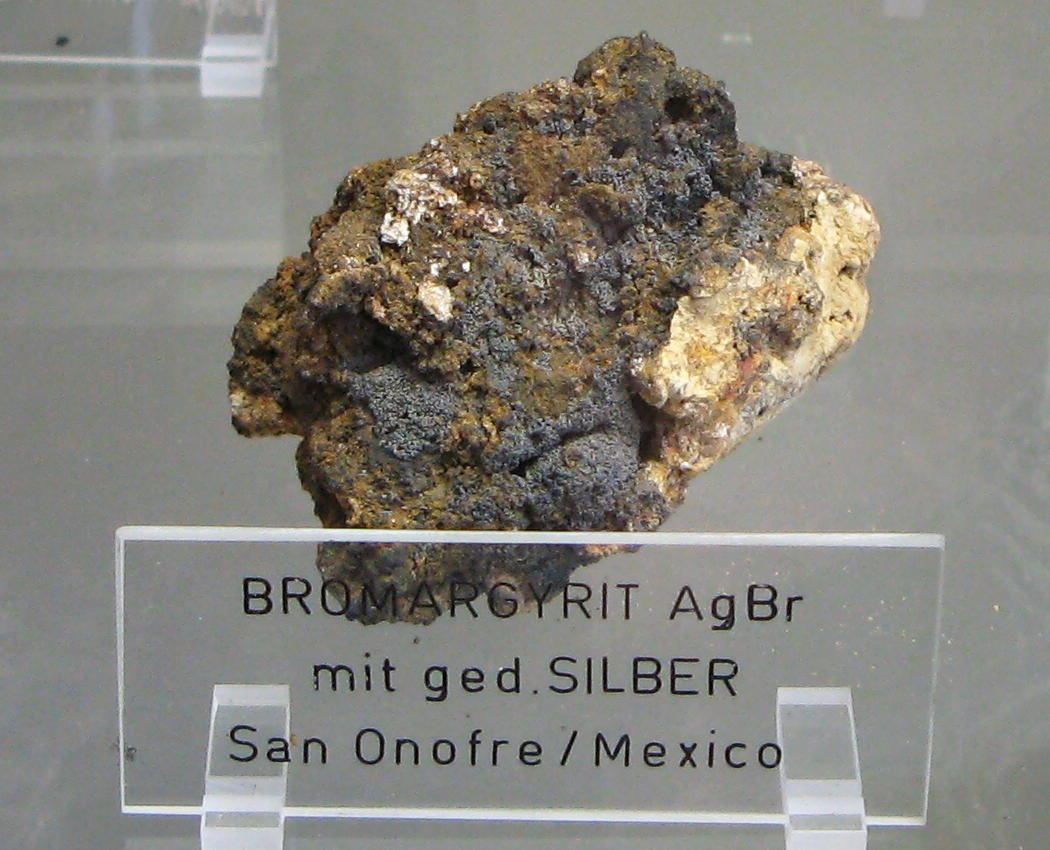
- Bromargyrite with silver – San Onofre, Mexico.

General
- Category: Halide minerals
- Formula: AgBr
- Strunz classification: 3.AA.15
- Crystal system: Isometric
- Crystal class: Hexoctahedral (m3̅m); H-M symbol (4/m 3̅ 2/m)
- Space group: Fm3m
- Unit cell: a = 5.7745 Å; Z = 4

Identification
- Color: Yellowish, greenish brown, bright green
- Cleavage: None observed
- Fracture: Irregular/uneven, sub-conchoidal
- Tenacity: Sectile
- Mohs scale hardness: 2 1/2
- Luster: Adamantine, resinous, waxy
- Streak: White to yellowish white
- Diaphaneity: Transparent, translucent
- Specific gravity: 6.474
- Optical properties: Isotropic
- Refractive index: n = 2.253
- Birefringence: δ = 0.000

Bromyrite or bromargyrite is a natural mineral form of silver bromide found mainly in Mexico and Chile. Hardness is 1.5 to 2. Related are chlorargyrite and iodyrite.

It was first described in 1859 for an occurrence in Plateros, Zacatecas, Mexico where it occurred in a silver deposit as an oxidation product of primary ore minerals. It occurs in arid environments along with native silver, iodargyrite and smithsonite along with iron and manganese oxide minerals.
