= Silver(II) fluoride =

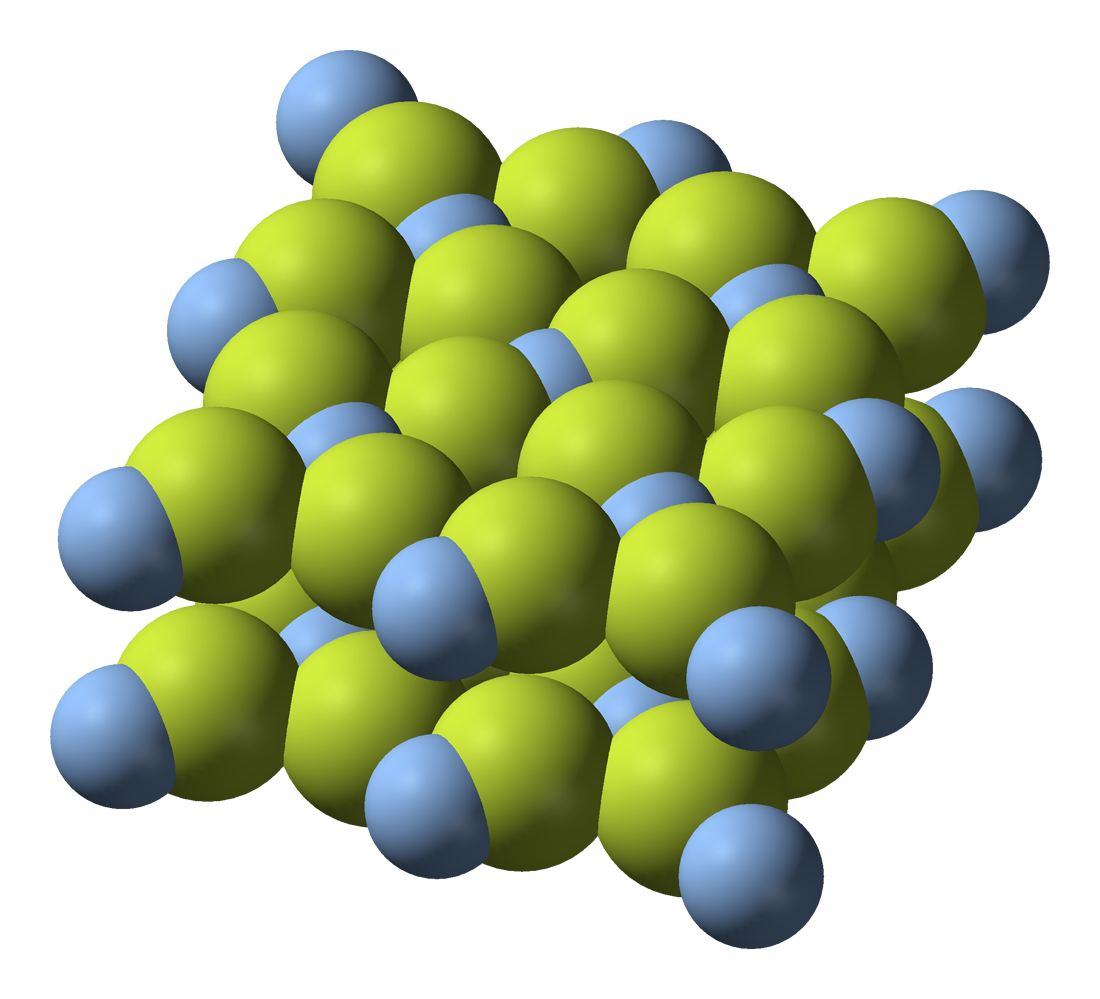
- Silver(II) fluoride

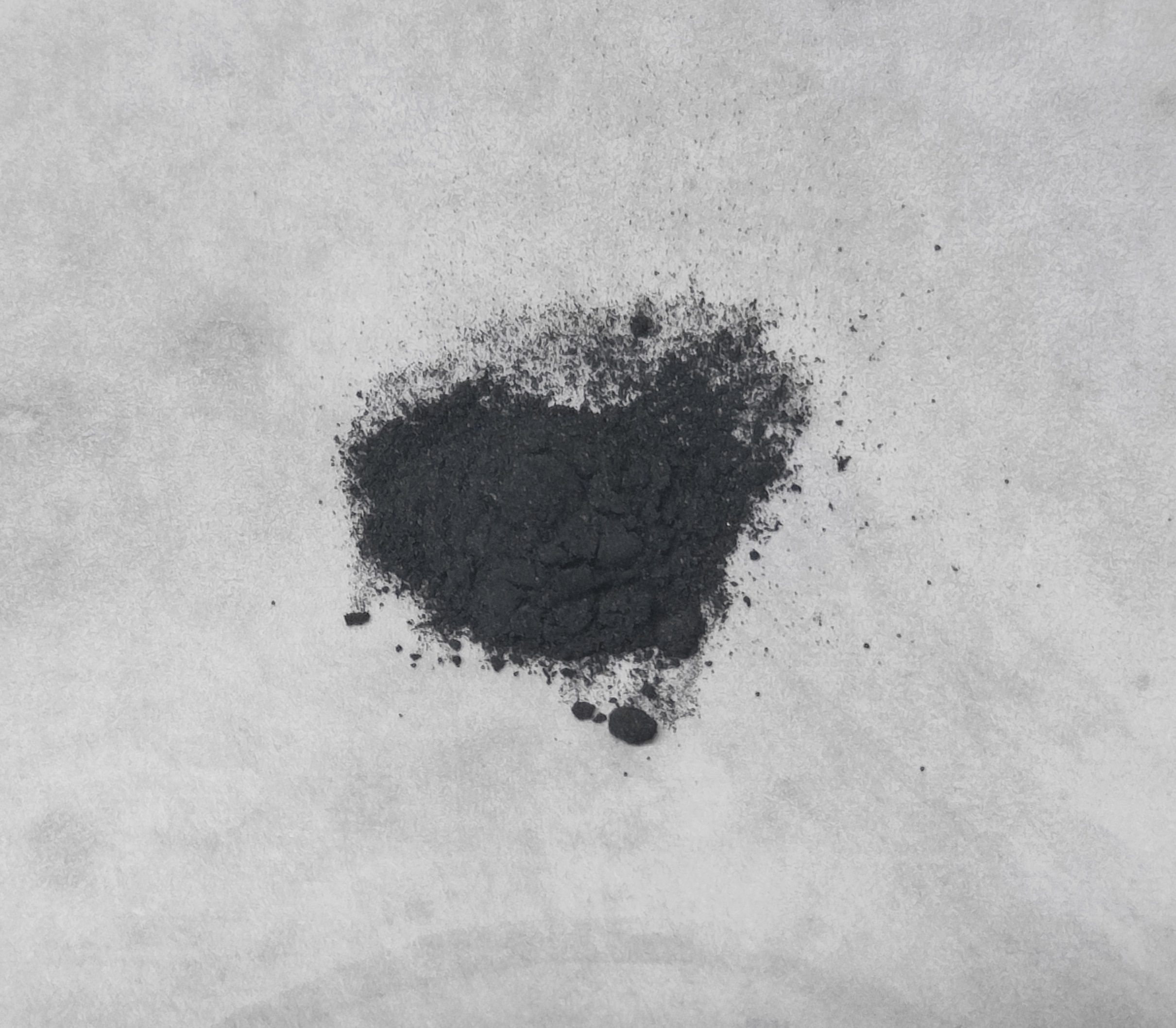

Names
- IUPAC name silver(II) fluoride
- Other names silver difluoride

Identifiers
CAS Number	7783-95-1
3D model (JSmol)	Interactive image
ChemSpider	10802085
ECHA InfoCard	100.029.124
EC Number	232-037-5
PubChem CID	82221
UNII	372MAR8LH9
CompTox Dashboard (EPA)	DTXSID5064835
- InChI: InChI=1S/Ag.2FH/h;2*1H/q+2;;/p-2 Key: KWVVTSALYXIJSS-UHFFFAOYSA-L; InChI=1/Ag.2FH/h;2*1H/q+2;;/p-2 Key: KWVVTSALYXIJSS-NUQVWONBAP
- SMILES: [Ag+2].[F-].[F-]

Properties
Chemical formula	AgF_{2}
Molar mass	145.865 g/mol
Appearance	white or grey crystalline powder, hygroscopic
Density	4.58 g/cm^{3}
Melting point	690 °C (1,274 °F; 963 K)
Boiling point	700 °C (1,292 °F; 973 K) (decomposes)
Solubility in water	Decomposes

Structure
Crystal structure	orthorhombic
Coordination geometry	tetragonally elongated octahedral coordination
Molecular shape	linear

Hazards
- Occupational safety and health (OHS/OSH)
Main hazards	toxic, reacts violently with water, powerful oxidizer
- GHS labelling
Pictograms	(GHS03: Oxidizing) (GHS05: Corrosive) (GHS06: Toxic)
Signal word	Danger
Hazard statements	H272, H301, H302, H311, H312, H314, H331, H332
Precautionary statements	P210, P220, P221, P260, P264, P270, P271, P280, P301+P310, P301+P312, P301+P330+P331, P302+P352, P303+P361+P353, P304+P312, P304+P340, P305+P351+P338, P310, P311, P312, P321, P322, P330, P361, P363, P370+P378, P403+P233, P405, P501
NFPA 704 (fire diamond)	3 0 3 W; OX
Safety data sheet (SDS)	MSDS

Related compounds
Other anions	Silver(I,III) oxide
Other cations	Copper(II) fluoride Palladium(II) fluoride Zinc fluoride Cadmium(II) fluoride Mercury(II) fluoride
Related compounds	Silver subfluoride Silver(I) fluoride
- Except where otherwise noted, data are given for materials in their standard state (at 25 °C [77 °F], 100 kPa). verify (what is ?) Infobox references

Silver(II) fluoride is a chemical compound with the formula AgF_{2}. It is a rare example of a silver(II) compound - silver usually exists in its +1 oxidation state. It is used as a fluorinating agent.

== Composition and structure ==
AgF_{2} is a white crystalline powder, but it is usually black/brown due to impurities. The F/Ag ratio for most samples is < 2, typically approaching 1.75 due to contamination with Ag and oxides and carbon.

For some time, it was doubted that silver was actually in the +2 oxidation state, rather than some combination of states such as Ag^{I}[Ag^{III}F_{4}], which would be similar to silver(I,III) oxide. Neutron diffraction studies, however, confirmed its description as silver(II). The Ag^{I}[Ag^{III}F_{4}] was found to be present at high temperatures, but it was unstable with respect to AgF_{2}.

In the gas phase, AgF_{2} is believed to have D_{∞h} symmetry. Per single-crystal X-ray diffraction, the silver atoms are square planar-coordinated in the solid state.

Approximately 14 kcal/mol (59 kJ/mol; 0.61 eV/f.u.) separate the ground and first excited states. The compound is paramagnetic, but it becomes ferromagnetic at temperatures below −110 °C (163 K).

== Preparation ==
AgF_{2} can be synthesized by fluorinating Ag_{2}O with elemental fluorine. Also, at 200 °C (473 K) elemental fluorine will react with AgF or AgCl to produce AgF_{2}.

== Uses ==
AgF_{2} is a strong fluorinating and oxidising agent. It is formed as an intermediate in the catalysis of gaseous reactions with fluorine by silver. With fluoride ions, it forms complex ions such as AgF^{−}_{3}, the blue-violet AgF^{2−}_{4}, and AgF^{4−}_{6}.

It is used in the fluorination and preparation of organic perfluorocompounds. This type of reaction can occur in three different ways (here Z refers to any element or group attached to carbon, X is a halogen):

1. CZ_{3}H + 2 AgF_{2} → CZ_{3}F + HF + 2 AgF
2. CZ_{3}X + 2AgF_{2} → CZ_{3}F + X_{2} + 2 AgF
3. Z_{2}C=CZ_{2} + 2 AgF_{2} → Z_{2}CFCFZ_{2} + 2 AgF

Similar transformations can also be effected using other high valence metallic fluorides such as CoF_{3}, MnF_{3}, CeF_{4}, and PbF_{4}.

AgF_{2} is also used in the fluorination of aromatic compounds, although selective monofluorinations are more difficult:

C_{6}H_{6} + 2 AgF_{2} → C_{6}H_{5}F + 2 AgF + HF

AgF_{2} oxidises xenon to xenon difluoride in anhydrous HF solutions.

2 AgF_{2} + Xe → 2 AgF + XeF_{2}

It also oxidises carbon monoxide to carbonyl fluoride.

2 AgF_{2} + CO → 2 AgF + COF_{2}

It reacts with water to form oxygen gas:

4 AgF_{2} + 4 H_{2}O → 2 Ag_{2}O + 8 HF + O_{2}

AgF_{2} can be used to selectively fluorinate pyridine at the ortho position under mild conditions.

== Safety ==
AgF_{2} is a very strong oxidizer that reacts violently with water, reacts with dilute acids to produce ozone, oxidizes iodide to iodine, and upon contact with acetylene forms the contact explosive silver acetylide. It is light-sensitive, very hygroscopic and corrosive. It decomposes violently on contact with hydrogen peroxide, releasing oxygen gas. It also liberates HF, F_{2}, and elemental silver.
