= Sensitivity speck =

A sensitivity speck or sensitivity center is an imperfection or other specific point in a silver halide crystal which traps electrons, causing photosensitivity. This can produce a latent image in the crystal, having applications in photography and dosimetry.

A sensitivity speck is very often the site of shallow electron traps, such as crystalline defect (particularly edge dislocation) and silver sulfide specks created by sulfur sensitization process.

When a photon is absorbed by a silver halide crystal, a free-carrier (electron in the conduction band) is generated. This free-carrier can migrate through the crystal lattice of silver halide, until captured by the shallow electron trap, where the electron is likely to reduce an interstitial silver ion to form an atomic silver. Subsequent exposure can grow the size of silver cluster through the same mechanism. This forms the latent image where the silver cluster becomes large enough to render the entire crystal developable in developer solution.

== See also ==
- Gelatin silver print

== Bibliography ==
- Fosbinder, Robert, and Orth, Denise. Essentials of Radiologic Science. United Kingdom, Wolters Kluwer Health/Lippincott Williams & Wilkins, 2011.
