= Silver subfluoride =

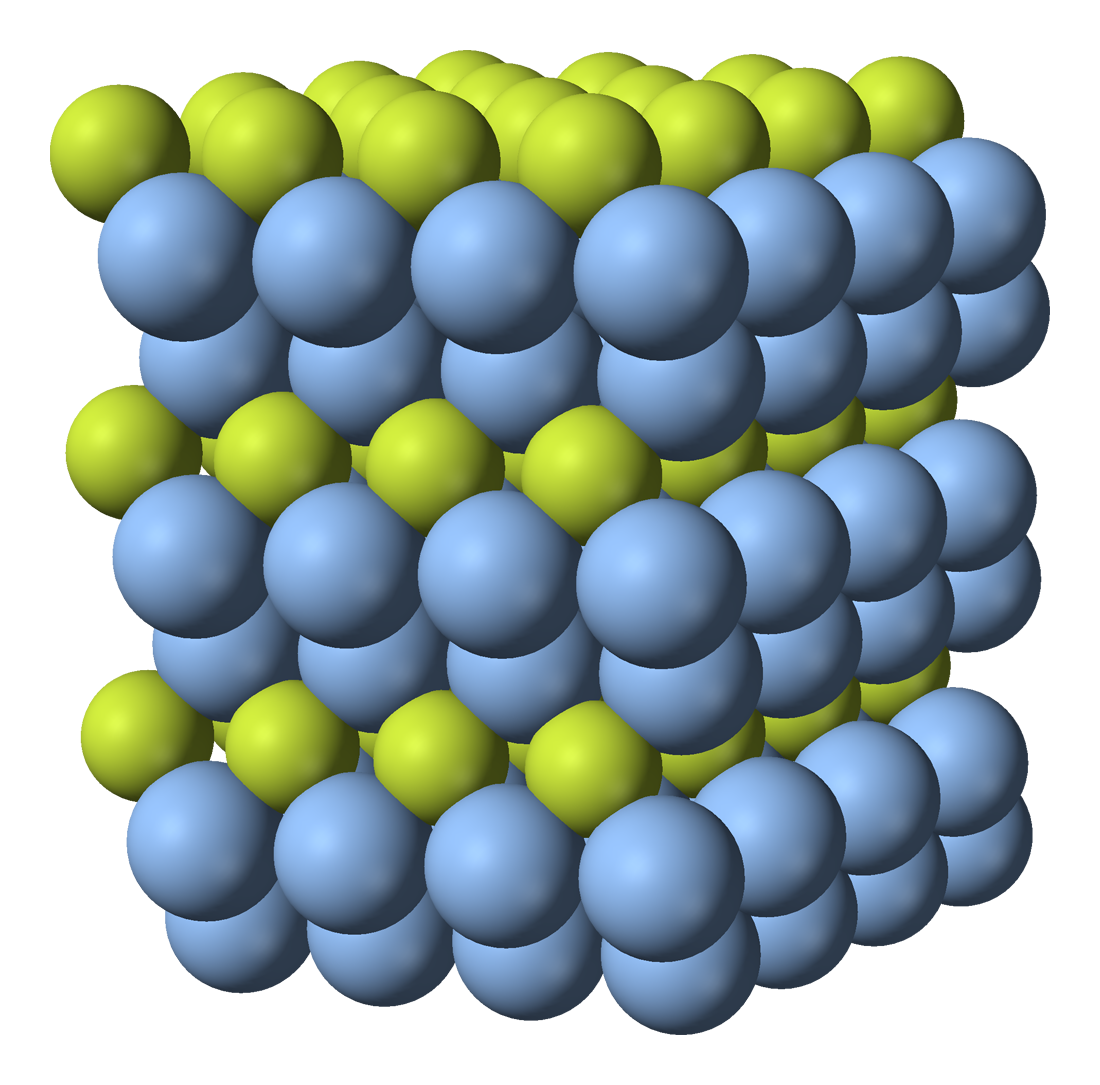
- Silver subfluoride

Names
- IUPAC name silver(0,I) fluoride

Identifiers
CAS Number	1302-01-8
3D model (JSmol)	Interactive image
PubChem CID	154085723
- InChI: InChI=1S/2Ag.FH/h;;1H/q;+1;/p-1 Key: NYHLXUAEPHSVOU-UHFFFAOYSA-M
- SMILES: F[Ag].[Ag]

Properties
Chemical formula	Ag_{2}F
Molar mass	234.734 g/mol
Appearance	Bronze-colored crystals with green luster
Density	8.6 g/cm^{3}, solid
Melting point	90 °C (194 °F; 363 K) decomposition
Solubility in water	reacts

Related compounds
Related compounds	Silver(I) fluoride Silver(II) fluoride Silver(III) fluoride
- Except where otherwise noted, data are given for materials in their standard state (at 25 °C [77 °F], 100 kPa). verify (what is ?) Infobox references

Silver subfluoride is the inorganic compound with the formula Ag_{2}F. This is an unusual example of a compound where the oxidation state of silver is fractional. The compound is produced by the reaction of silver and silver(I) fluoride:

Ag + AgF → Ag_{2}F

It forms small crystals with a bronze reflex and is a good conductor of electricity. On contact with water almost instant hydrolysis occurs with the precipitation of silver (Ag) powder.

== Crystal structure ==
Ag_{2}F adopts the anti-CdI_{2} crystal structure, i.e. the same structure as cadmium iodide, CdI_{2}, but with "Ag^{½+}" centres in the I^{−} positions and F^{−} in the Cd^{2+} positions. The shortest distance between silver atoms is 299.6 pm (compared to 289 pm in the metal).
