= Iodargyrite =

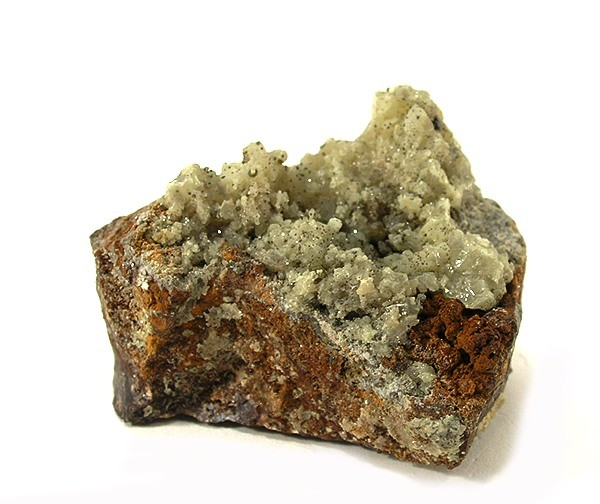
- Iodargyrite on gossan, Broken Hill Ore Deposit, New South Wales, Australia.

General
- Category: Halide minerals
- Formula: AgI
- IMA symbol: Iag
- Strunz classification: 3.AA.10
- Crystal system: Hexagonal
- Crystal class: Dihexagonal pyramidal (6mm); H-M symbol: (6mm)
- Space group: P6mm
- Unit cell: a = 4.59, c = 7.51 [Å]; Z = 2

Identification
- Color: Colorless (fresh); pale yellow, yellow, greenish yellow, brownish, grayish
- Mohs scale hardness: 1 1/2 – 2
- Luster: Adamantine, resinous
- Streak: Yellow (shining)
- Diaphaneity: Transparent, translucent
- Specific gravity: 5.69
- Optical properties: Uniaxial (+)
- Refractive index: n_{ω} = 2.210 n_{ε} = 2.220
- Birefringence: δ = 0.010

Iodyrite or iodargyrite is a natural mineral form of silver iodide.

Related minerals are chlorargyrite and bromargyrite.
