= Silver(III) fluoride =

Unstable silver compound in the unusual +3 oxidation state

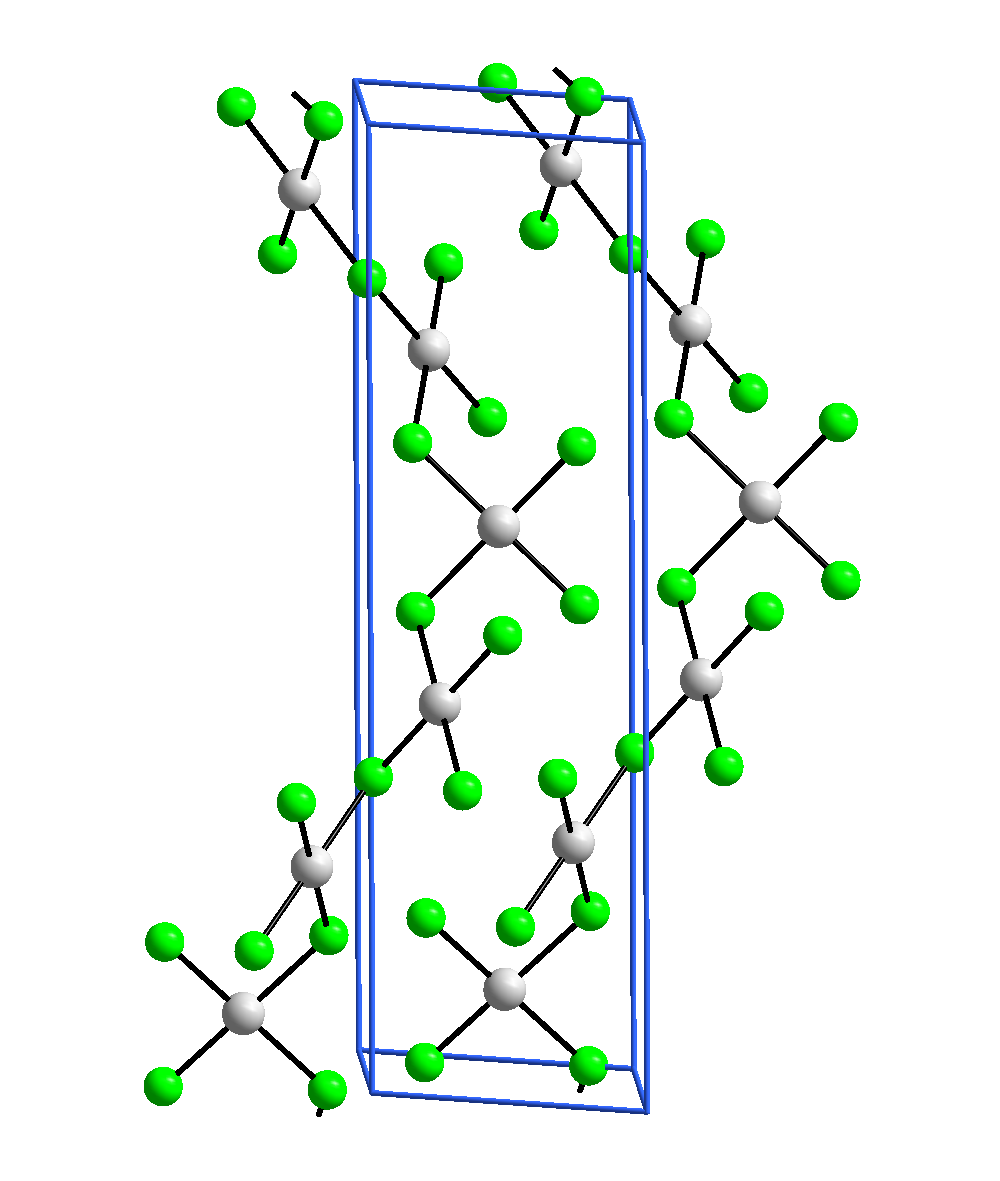

Names
- IUPAC name Silver(III) fluoride
- Other names Silver trifluoride Argentic fluoride

Identifiers
CAS Number	91899-63-7
3D model (JSmol)	Interactive image
ChEBI	CHEBI:30338
ChemSpider	65322083
Gmelin Reference	100808
PubChem CID	139031062
CompTox Dashboard (EPA)	DTXSID001045637
- InChI: InChI=1S/Ag.3FH/h;3*1H/q+3;;;/p-3 Key: PGGQSYHSNJQLOQ-UHFFFAOYSA-K
- SMILES: [F-].[F-].[F-].[Ag+3]

Properties
Chemical formula	AgF_{3}
Molar mass	164.86 g/mol
- Except where otherwise noted, data are given for materials in their standard state (at 25 °C [77 °F], 100 kPa). Infobox references

Silver(III) fluoride, AgF_{3}, is an unstable, bright-red, diamagnetic compound containing silver in the unusual +3 oxidation state. Its crystal structure is very similar to that of gold(III) fluoride: it is a polymer consisting of rectangular AgF_{4} units linked into chains by fluoro bridges.

== Preparation ==
AgF_{3} can be prepared by treating a solution containing tetrafluoroargentate(III) ions in anhydrous hydrogen fluoride with boron trifluoride; the potassium tetrafluoroargentate(III) was prepared by heating a stoichiometric mix of potassium and silver nitrate in a sealed container filled with pressurised fluorine gas at 400 °C for 24 hours, twice. When dissolved in anhydrous HF, it decomposes spontaneously to Ag_{3}F_{8} overnight at room temperature. The high-valence silver compounds described in the thesis are notable for their variety of colours: KAgF_{4} is bright orange, AgF_{3} bright red, AgFAsF_{6} is deep blue, Ag_{3}F_{8} deep red-brown, and Pd(AgF_{4})_{2} is lime-green.

Earlier preparations used krypton difluoride as fluorinating agent, and tended to produce the mixed-valence Ag_{3}F_{8} which may be thought of as silver(II) tetrafluoroargentate(III); Ag_{2}F_{5}, which is (AgF)^{+}AgF_{4}^{−}, is formed by reacting AgF_{3} with AgFAsF_{6}.
