= Silver iodide =

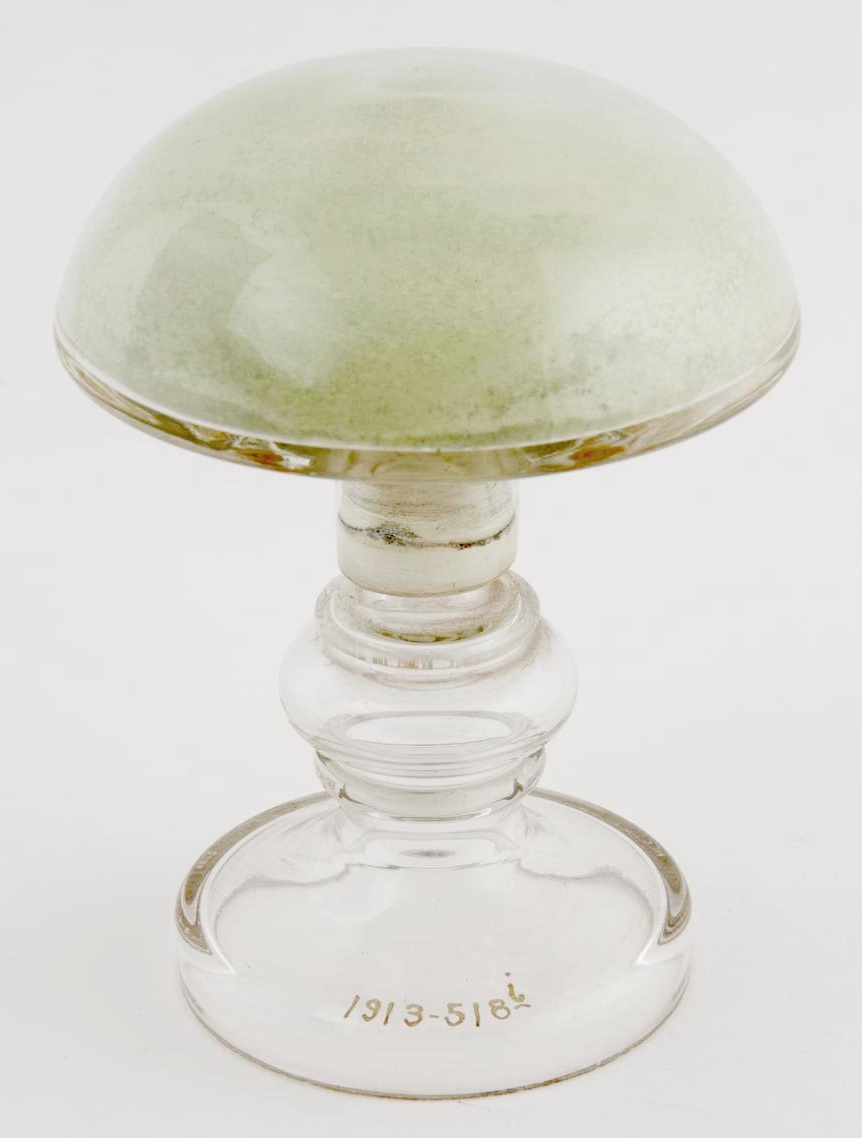

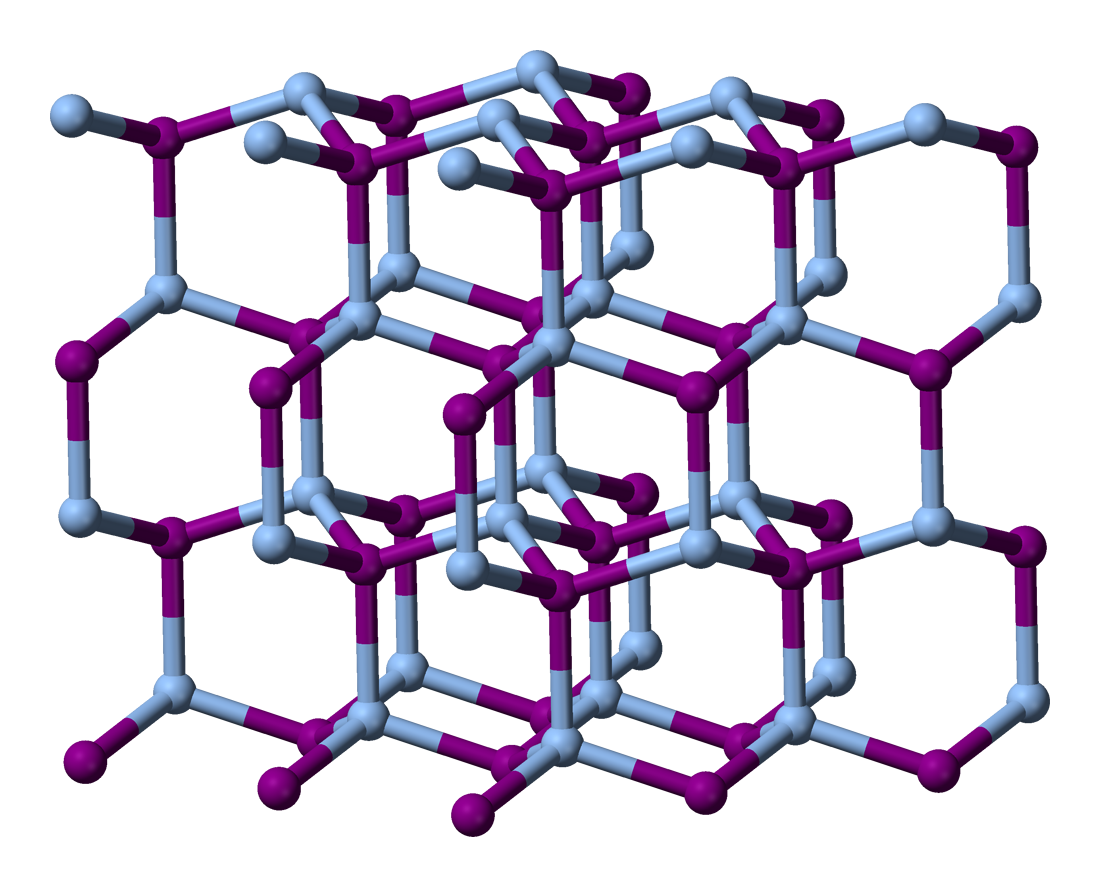
- Silver iodide

Names
- IUPAC name Silver(I) iodide
- Other names Argentous iodide

Identifiers
CAS Number	7783-96-2
3D model (JSmol)	Interactive image
ChemSpider	22969
ECHA InfoCard	100.029.125
EC Number	232-038-0
PubChem CID	6432717
UNII	81M6Z3D1XE
CompTox Dashboard (EPA)	DTXSID0064836
- InChI: InChI=1S/Ag.HI/h;1H/q+1;/p-1 Key: MSFPLIAKTHOCQP-UHFFFAOYSA-M; InChI=1/Ag.HI/h;1H/q+1;/p-1 Key: MSFPLIAKTHOCQP-REWHXWOFAV
- SMILES: [Ag]I

Properties
Chemical formula	AgI
Molar mass	234.77 g/mol
Appearance	yellow, crystalline solid
Odor	odorless
Density	5.68 g/cm^{3}, solid
Melting point	558 °C (1,036 °F; 831 K)
Boiling point	1,506 °C (2,743 °F; 1,779 K)
Solubility in water	0.03 mg/L (20 °C)
Solubility product (K_{sp})	8.52 × 10 ^{−17}
Solubility	very soluble in liquid ammonia
Magnetic susceptibility (χ)	−80.0·10^{−6} cm^{3}/mol

Structure
Crystal structure	Hexagonal, hP4
Space group	P6_{3}mc, No. 186
Lattice constant	a = 0.4591 nm, c = 0.7508 nm α = 90°, β = 90°, γ = 120°
Formula units (Z)	2
Dipole moment	4.55 D

Thermochemistry
Heat capacity (C)	56.8 J·mol^{−1}·K^{−1}
Std molar entropy (S^{⦵}_{298})	115.5 J·mol^{−1}·K^{−1}
Std enthalpy of formation (Δ_{f}H^{⦵}_{298})	−61.8 kJ·mol^{−1}
Gibbs free energy (Δ_{f}G^{⦵})	−66.2 kJ·mol^{−1}

Hazards
- GHS labelling
Pictograms	(GHS09: Environmental hazard)
Signal word	Warning
Hazard statements	H410
NFPA 704 (fire diamond)	2 0 0
Flash point	Non-flammable
Safety data sheet (SDS)	Sigma-Aldrich
- Except where otherwise noted, data are given for materials in their standard state (at 25 °C [77 °F], 100 kPa). verify (what is ?) Infobox references

Silver iodide is an inorganic compound with the formula AgI. The compound is a bright yellow salt, but samples almost always contain impurities of metallic silver that give a grey colouration. The silver contamination arises because some samples of AgI can be highly photosensitive. This property is exploited in silver-based photography. Silver iodide is also used as an antiseptic and in cloud seeding.

== Structure ==
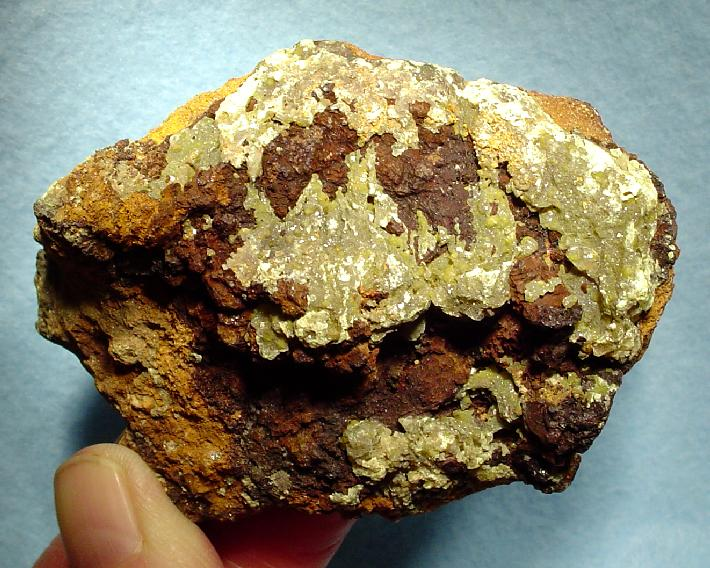
The golden-yellow crystals on this mineral sample are iodargyrite, a naturally occurring form of β-AgI

The structure adopted by silver iodide is temperature dependent.

Below 420 K, the β phase of AgI, with the wurtzite structure, is most stable. This phase is encountered in nature as the mineral iodargyrite.

Above 420 K, the α phase becomes more stable. This motif is a body-centered cubic structure which has the silver centers distributed randomly between 6 octahedral, 12 tetrahedral and 24 trigonal sites. At this temperature, Ag^{+} ions can move rapidly through the solid, allowing fast ion conduction. The transition between the β and α forms represents the melting of the silver (cation) sublattice. The entropy of fusion for α-AgI is approximately half that for sodium chloride (a typical ionic solid). This can be rationalized by considering the AgI crystalline lattice to have already "partly melted" in the transition between α and β polymorphs.

A metastable γ phase also exists below 420 K with the zinc blende structure.

== Preparation and properties ==
Silver iodide is prepared by reaction of an iodide solution (e.g., potassium iodide) with a solution of silver ions (e.g., silver nitrate). A yellowish solid quickly precipitates. The solid is a mixture of the two principal phases. Dissolution of the AgI in hydroiodic acid, followed by dilution with water, precipitates β-AgI. Alternatively, dissolution of AgI in a solution of concentrated silver nitrate followed by dilution affords α-AgI. Unless the preparation is conducted in dark conditions, the solid darkens rapidly, the light causing the reduction of ionic silver to metallic. The photosensitivity varies with sample purity.

== Cloud seeding ==
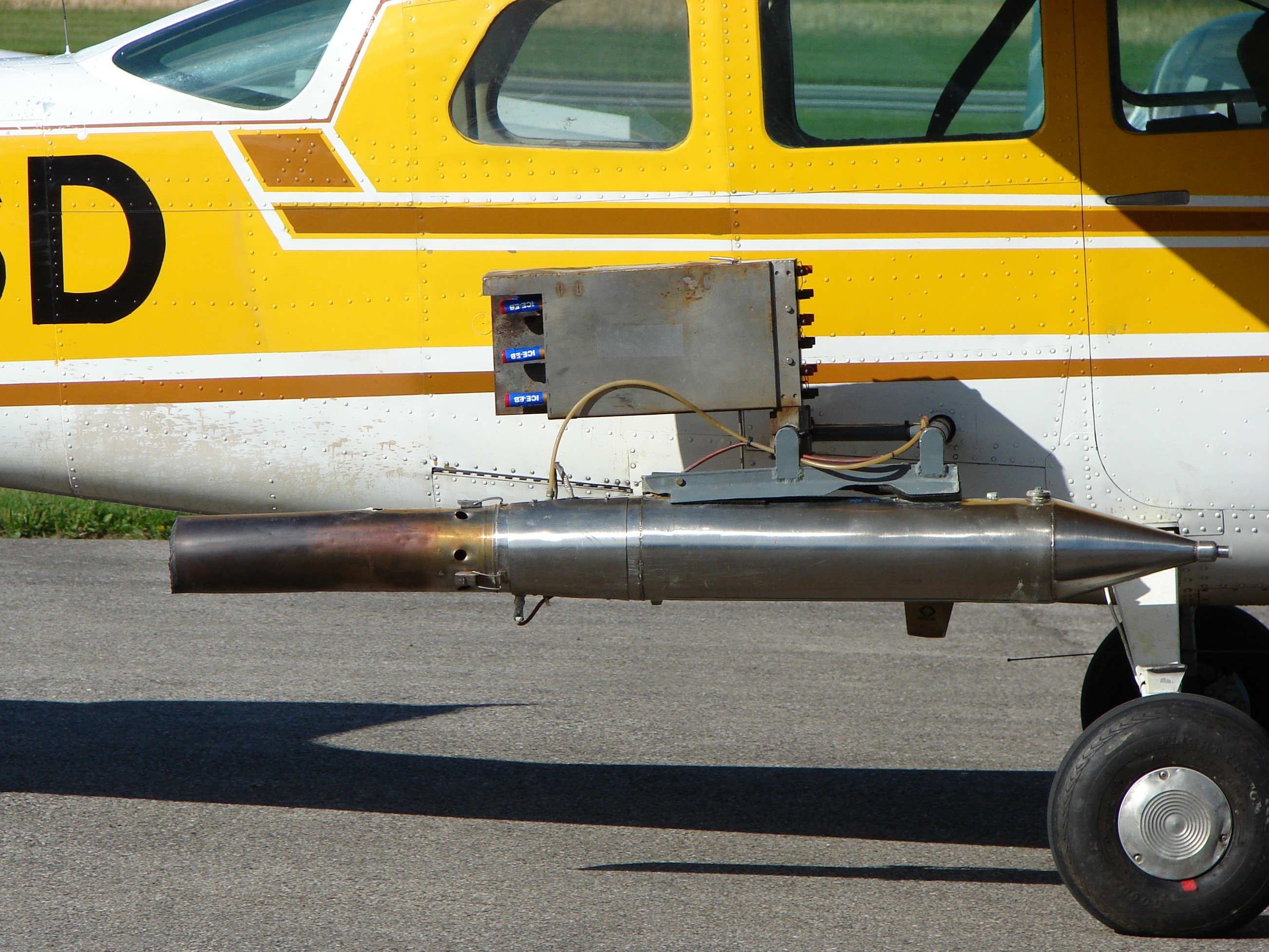
Cessna 210 equipped with a silver iodide generator for cloud seeding

The use of silver iodide for cloud seeding was discovered by Bernard Vonnegut in 1946. The crystalline structure of β-AgI is similar to that of ice, allowing it to induce freezing by the process known as heterogeneous nucleation. Approximately 11,000 kg are used for cloud seeding annually, each seeding experiment consuming 10–50 grams.

== Safety ==
Extreme exposure can lead to argyria, characterized by localized discolouration of body tissue.

== Cited sources ==
- Haynes, William M., ed. (2016). CRC Handbook of Chemistry and Physics (97th ed.). CRC Press. ISBN 9781498754293.
