= Silver(III) oxide =

Names
- IUPAC name Silver(III) oxide

Identifiers
3D model (JSmol)	Interactive image
- InChI: InChI=1S/2Ag.3O/q2*+3;3*-2 Key: PAYVRWUIVULNDO-UHFFFAOYSA-N
- SMILES: [Ag+3].[Ag+3].[O-2].[O-2].[O-2]

Properties
Chemical formula	Ag_{2}O_{3}
Molar mass	263.733 g·mol^{−1}

Related compounds
Other anions	Silver(III) fluoride
Other cations	Gold(III) oxide
Related silver oxides	Silver(I) oxide Silver(I,III) oxide
- Except where otherwise noted, data are given for materials in their standard state (at 25 °C [77 °F], 100 kPa). Infobox references

Silver(III) oxide is a chemical compound with the formula Ag_{2}O_{3}, made up of silver and oxygen atoms. It is unstable and difficult to obtain, though it has been produced through electrolysis and/or oxidation of other silver compounds. It adopts the same structure as gold(III) oxide. It has been considered for the production of naphtha and as an antimicrobial agent.

== Synthesis ==
While silver(III) oxide is very difficult to obtain, several methods of producing it have been devised. It is formed by the anodic oxidation of silver perchlorate, silver tetrafluoroborate, or silver hexafluorophosphate. Anodic oxidation of silver nitrate was found not to produce silver(III) oxide, but it can be obtained from silver nitrate in other ways. The first synthesis of silver(III) oxide was made by the oxidation of oxidation of silver nitrate by potassium persulfate. The electrolysis of silver nitrate produces silver(III) oxide clathrate (as well as silver metal). The electrolysis of sodium perchlorate and silver perchlorate also produces silver(III) oxide.

== Stability ==
Silver(III) oxide is unstable, as illustrated by its difficulty in preparation. Over time, it decomposes to form the stable compound Ag_{4}O_{5}. Down the group 11 elements (copper, silver, and gold), the stability of M_{2}O_{3} (M = group 11 metal) increases, due to an increase in interactions between d orbitals in the metal and p orbitals in oxygen.

== Structure ==
Silver(III) oxide is isostructural with gold(III) oxide. Each silver atom has a coordination geometry of slightly distorted square planar, bonding with four oxygen atoms to form AgO_{4} units. Three of these oxygen atoms are bonded to three silver atoms each, while the fourth is bonded to two, leading to the distortion. The AgO_{4} units are linked together by sharing oxygen atoms to form a three-dimensional network. The silver-oxygen bonds are mainly contributed to by 4d orbitals in silver and 2p orbitals in oxygen, though there are slight contributions from silver's 5s and 5p orbitals.

== Uses ==
Silver(III) oxide/zeolite has proposed as a catalyst for oxidative desulfurization, a process for removing sulfur-containing compounds from materials such as naphtha.

It has been considered for its antimicrobial properties; silver(III) oxide clathrate has been found to have stronger antimicrobial effects than silver(I) oxide, but its usefulness in antimicrobial applications has been hindered by its difficulty of synthesis and stabilization.
