= Nitratoauric acid =

Chemical compound

Names
- IUPAC name Hydrogen tetranitratoaurate(III)
- Other names: Gold(III) nitrate; Auronitric acid; Gold(III) hydrogen nitrate; Aurinitric acid

Identifiers
CAS Number	13464-77-2
3D model (JSmol)	Interactive image
ChemSpider	21241708
EC Number	236-687-0
PubChem CID	102601521
- InChI: InChI=1S/Au.HNO3.3NO3.3H2O/c;4*2-1(3)4;;;/h;(H,2,3,4);;;;3*1H2/q+3;;3*-1;;; Key: DXRCZEMEUMQLGJ-UHFFFAOYSA-N
- SMILES: [N+](=O)(O)[O-].[N+](=O)([O-])[O-].[N+](=O)([O-])[O-].[N+](=O)([O-])[O-].O.O.O.[Au+3]

Properties
Chemical formula	HAu(NO_{3})_{4}
Molar mass	445.99 g/mol (anhydrous); 500.04 g/mol (trihydrate)
Appearance	Brown Crystals
Density	2.84 g/cm^{3}
Melting point	72.6 °C (162.7 °F; 345.8 K)
Solubility in water	Hydrolyzes
Solubility in nitric acid	Insoluble (0 °C); Soluble (30 °C)

Structure
Crystal structure	Monoclinic
Space group	C2/c
Lattice constant	a = 1214.5 pm, b = 854.4 pm, c = 1225.7 pm

Hazards
- Occupational safety and health (OHS/OSH)
Main hazards	Oxidizing
- GHS labelling
Pictograms	(GHS03: Oxidizing)
Signal word	Danger
Hazard statements	H272, H302, H312, H315, H318, H332, H335
Precautionary statements	P210, P220, P221, P261, P280, P302+P352, P304+P340, P305+P351+P338, P332+P313
NFPA 704 (fire diamond)	1 0 2 OX

Related compounds
Other anions	Chloroauric acid
Other cations	Potassium tetranitratoaurate
- Except where otherwise noted, data are given for materials in their standard state (at 25 °C [77 °F], 100 kPa). Infobox references

Nitratoauric acid, hydrogen tetranitratoaurate, or simply called gold(III) nitrate is a crystalline gold compound that forms the trihydrate, HAu(NO_{3})_{4}·3H_{2}O or more correctly H_{5}O_{2}Au(NO_{3})_{4}·H_{2}O. This compound is an intermediate in the process of extracting gold. In older literature it is also known as aurinitric acid.

== Preparation and reactions ==
Nitratoauric acid is prepared by the reaction of gold(III) hydroxide and concentrated nitric acid at 100 °C:

Au(OH)_{3} + 4HNO_{3} → HAu(NO_{3})_{4} + 3 H_{2}O

This compound reacts with potassium nitrate to form potassium tetranitratoaurate at 0 °C:

HAu(NO_{3})_{4} + KNO_{3} → KAu(NO_{3})_{4} + HNO_{3}

== Properties ==
Nitratoauric acid trihydrate decomposes to the monohydrate at 72 °C. If continually heated to 203 °C, it decomposes to auric oxide.

== Simple gold(III) nitrate ==
The production of the simple nitrate (Au(NO_{3})_{3}) was reported from the reaction of gold oxide and dinitrogen pentoxide, however, this was later proven to be nitronium tetranitratoaurate ((NO_{2})Au(NO_{3})_{4}).

However, the ammine complex of the simple gold nitrate is known. Au(NH_{3})_{4}(NO_{3})_{3}, also known as tetraamminegold(III) nitrate, is produced by the addition of ammonium nitrate to a solution of chloroauric acid. The hydrolysis of this compound produces fulminating gold.
