= Metal halides =

Class of chemical compounds

Metal halides are compounds between metals and halogens. Some, such as sodium chloride are ionic, while others are covalently bonded. A few metal halides are discrete molecules, such as uranium hexafluoride, but most adopt polymeric structures, such as palladium chloride.

Sodium chloride crystal structure

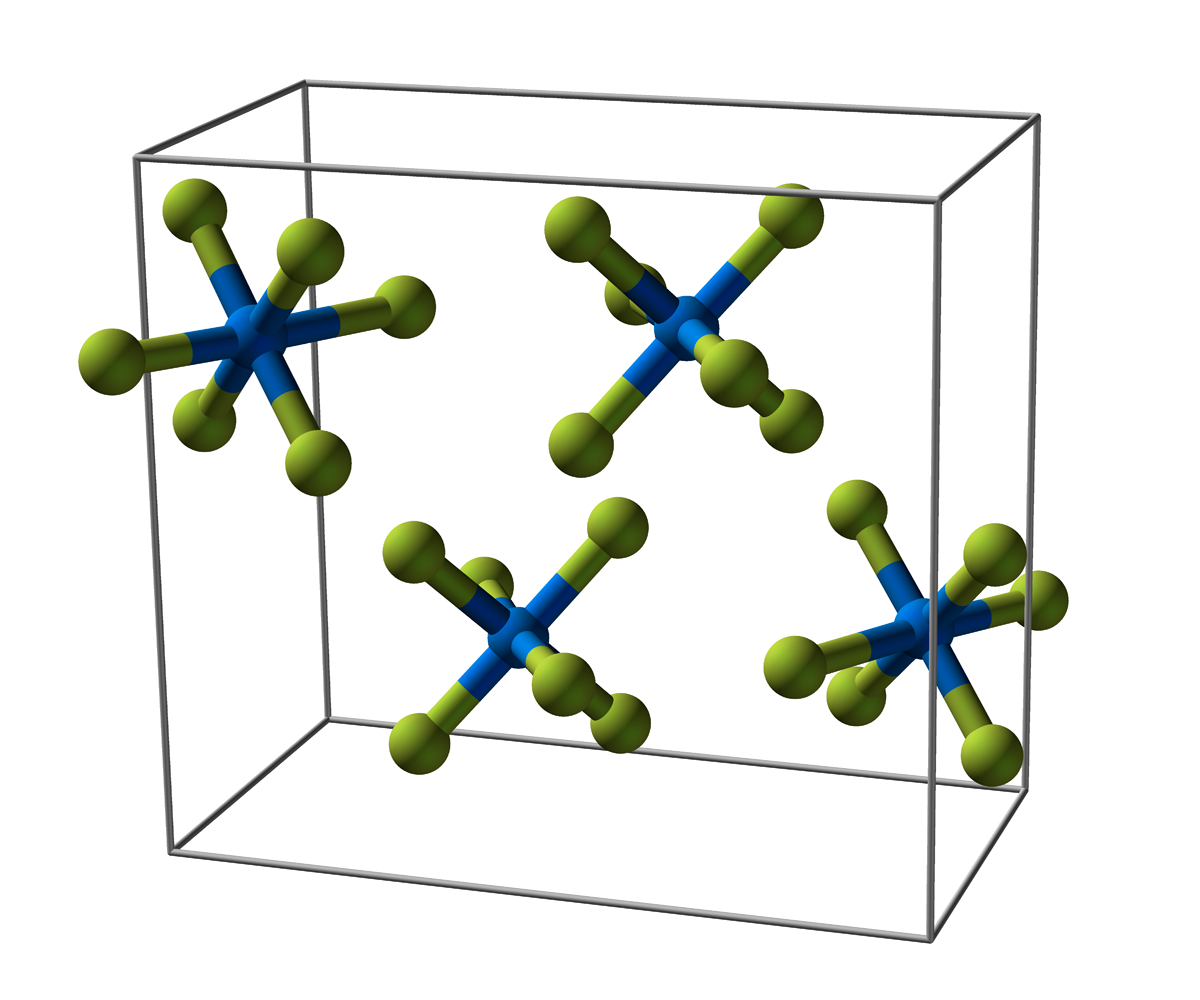
Discrete UF_{6} molecules

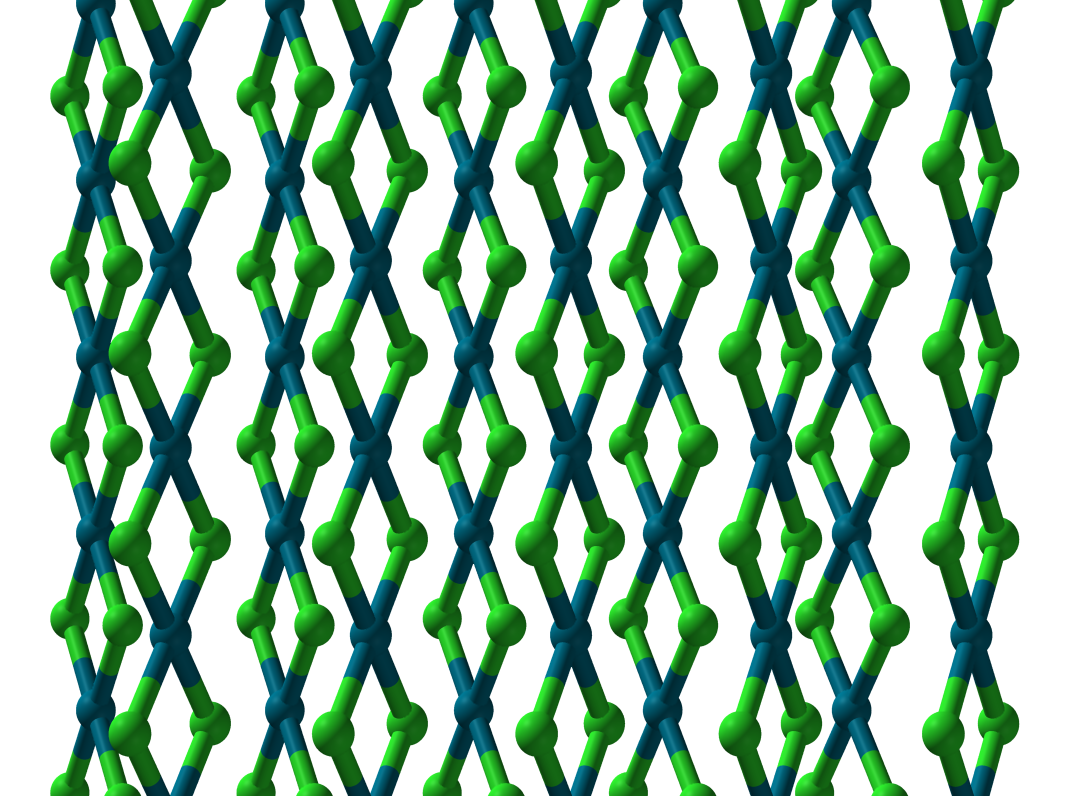
Infinite chains of one form of palladium chloride

== Preparation ==
The halogens can all react with metals to form metal halides according to the following equation:

2M + nX_{2} → 2MX_{n}

where M is the metal, X is the halogen, and MX_{n} is the metal halide.

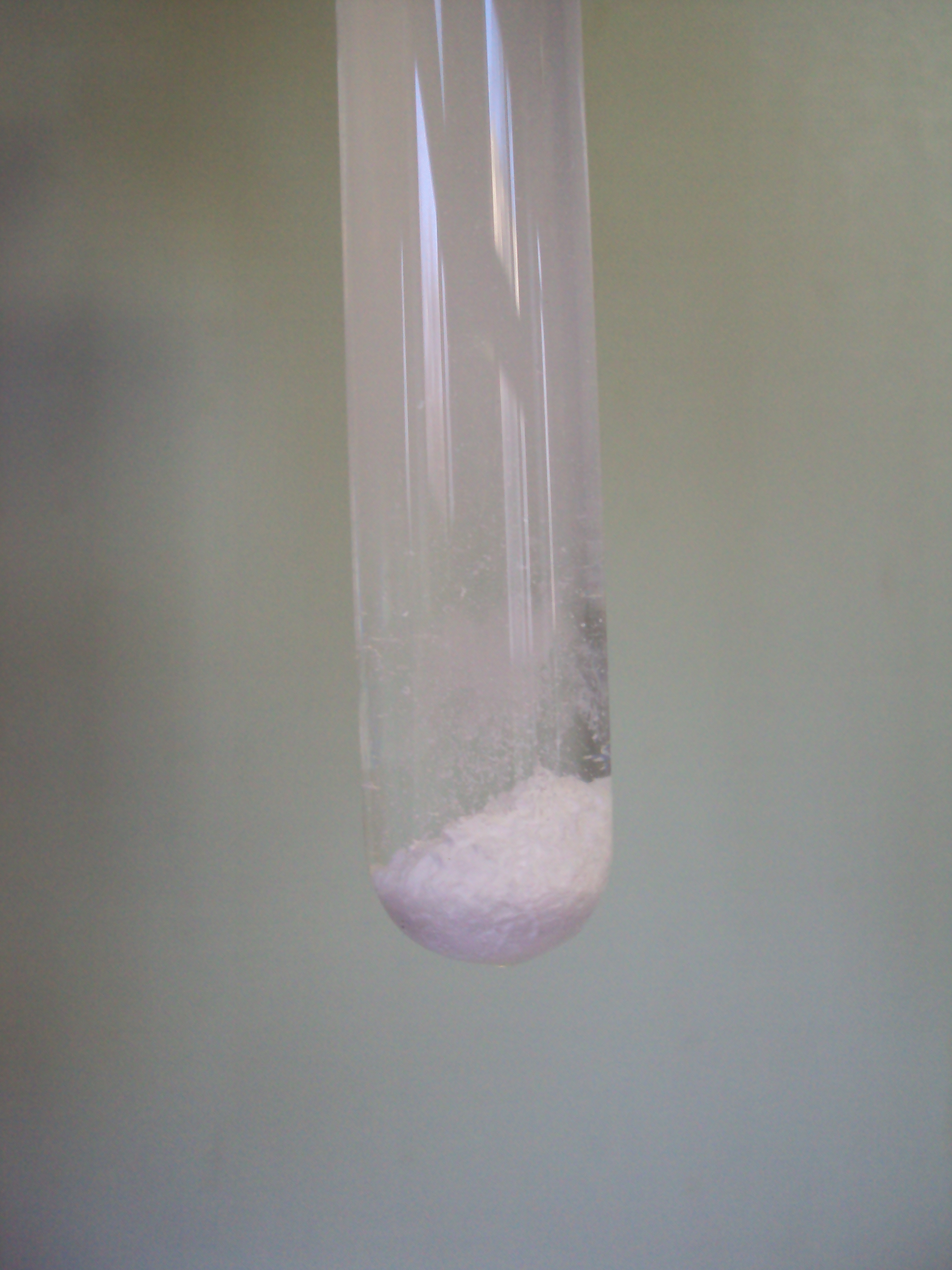
Sample of silver chloride

In practice, this type of reaction may be very exothermic, hence impractical as a preparative technique. Additionally, many transition metals can adopt multiple oxidation states, which complicates matters. As the halogens are strong oxidizers, direct combination of the elements usually leads to a highly oxidized metal halide. For example, ferric chloride can be prepared thus, but ferrous chloride cannot. Heating the higher halides may produce the lower halides; this occurs by thermal decomposition or by disproportionation. For example, gold(III) chloride to gold(I) chloride:

AuCl_{3} → AuCl + Cl_{2} at 160°C

Metal halides are also prepared by the neutralization of a metal oxide, hydroxide, or carbonate with the appropriate halogen acid. For example, with sodium hydroxide:

NaOH + HCl → NaCl + H_{2}O

Water can sometimes be removed by heat, vacuum, or the presence of anhydrous hydrohalic acid. Anhydrous metal chlorides suitable for preparing other coordination compounds may be dehydrated by treatment with thionyl chloride:

MCl_{n}·xH_{2}O + x SOCl_{2} → MCl_{n} + x SO_{2} + 2x HCl

The silver and thallium(I) cations have a great affinity for halide anions in solution, and the metal halide quantitatively precipitates from aqueous solution. This reaction is so reliable that silver nitrate is used to test for the presence and quantity of halide anions. The reaction of silver cations with bromide anions:

Ag^{+} (aq) + Br^{−} (aq) → AgBr (s)

Some metal halides may be prepared by reacting oxides with halogens in the presence of carbon (carbothermal reduction):

TiO_{2} + 2Cl_{2} + C → TiCl_{4}(l) + CO_{2}(g)

== Structure and reactivity ==
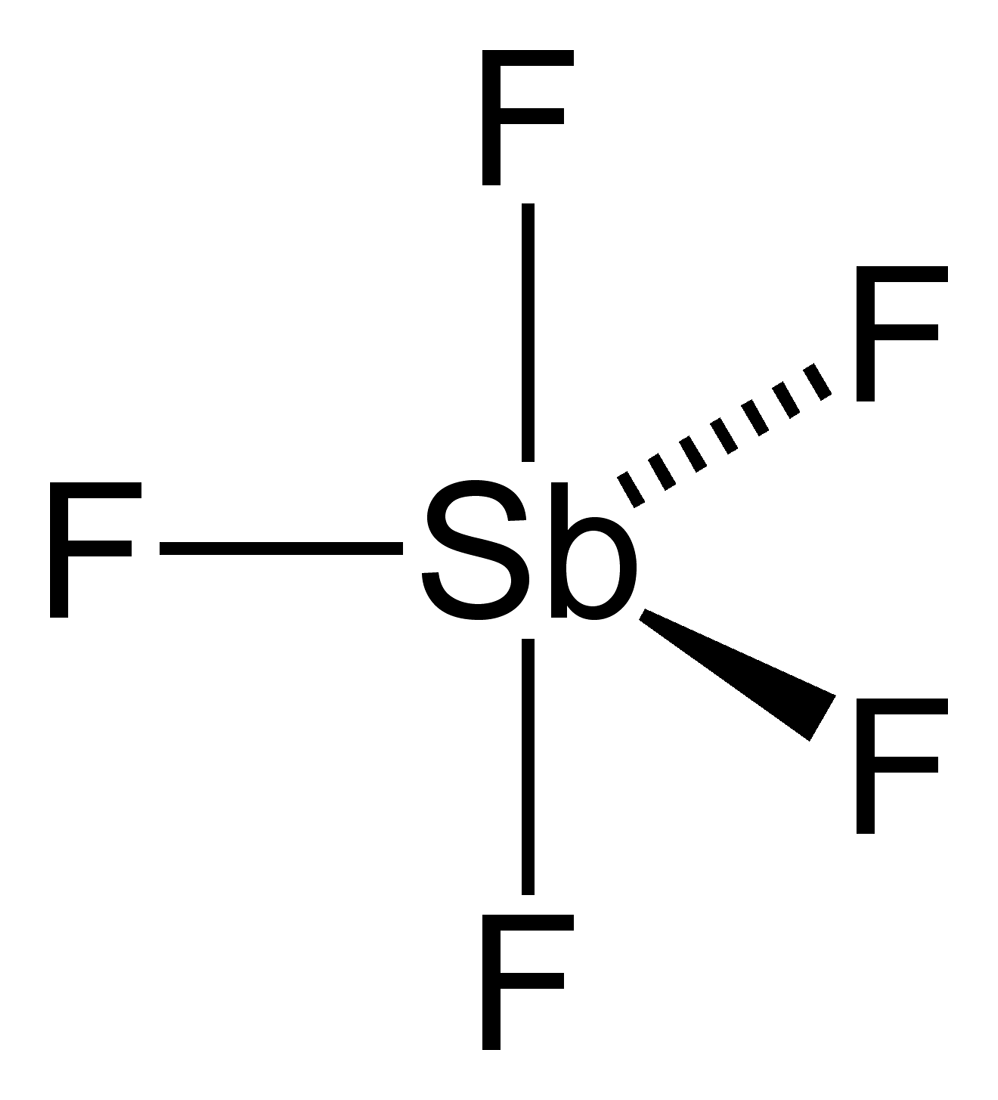
Antimony pentafluoride is the prototypical Lewis acid for the Gutmann scale

"Ionic" metal halides (predominantly of the alkali and alkali earth metals) tend to have very high melting and boiling points. They freely dissolve in water, and some are deliquescent. They are generally poorly soluble in organic solvents.

Some low-oxidation state transition metals have halides which dissolve well in water, such as ferrous chloride, nickelous chloride, and cupric chloride. Metal cations with a high oxidation state tend to undergo hydrolysis instead, e.g. ferric chloride, aluminium chloride, and titanium tetrachloride.

Discrete metal halides have lower melting and boiling points. For example, titanium tetrachloride melts at −25 °C and boils at 135 °C, making it a liquid at room temperature. They are usually insoluble in water, but soluble in organic solvent.

Polymeric metal halides generally have melting and boiling points that are higher than monomeric metal halides, but lower than ionic metal halides. They are soluble only in the presence of a ligand which liberates discrete units. For example, palladium chloride is quite insoluble in water, but it dissolves well in concentrated sodium chloride solution:

PdCl_{2} (s) + 2 Cl^{−} (aq) → PdCl_{4}^{2−} (aq)

Palladium chloride is insoluble in most organic solvents, but it forms soluble monomeric units with acetonitrile and benzonitrile:

[PdCl_{2}]_{n} + 2n CH_{3}CN → n PdCl_{2}(CH_{3}CN)_{2}

The tetrahedral tetrahalides of the first-row transition metals are prepared by addition of a quaternary ammonium chloride to the metal halide in a similar manner:

MCl_{2} + 2 Et_{4}NCl → (Et_{4}N)_{2}MCl_{4} (M = Mn, Fe, Co, Ni, Cu)

Antimony pentafluoride is a strong Lewis acid. It gives fluoroantimonic acid, the strongest known acid, with hydrogen fluoride. Antimony pentafluoride as the prototypical Lewis acid, used to compare different compounds' Lewis basicities. This measure of basicity is known as the Gutmann donor number.

== Halide ligands ==
Complex	colour	electron config.	geometry
[TiCl_{4}]	colourless	(t_{2g})^{0}	tetrahedral
[Ti_{2}Cl_{10}]^{2−}	colourless	(t_{2g})^{3}	bioctahedral
[TiCl_{6}]^{2−}	yellow	(t_{2g})^{0}	octahedral
[CrCl_{6}]^{3−}	??	(t_{2g})^{3}	octahedal
[MnCl_{4}]^{2−}	pale pink	(e_{g})^{2}(t_{2g})^{3}	tetrahedral
[FeCl_{4}]^{2−}	colourless	(e_{g})^{3}(t_{2g})^{3}	tetrahedral
[CoCl_{4}]^{2−}	blue	(e_{g})^{4}(t_{2g})^{3}	tetrahedral
[NiCl_{4}]^{2−}	blue	(e_{g})^{4}(t_{2g})^{4}	tetrahedral
[CuCl_{4}]^{2−}	green	(e_{g})^{4}(t_{2g})^{5}	tetrahedral
[PdCl_{4}]^{2−}	brown	d^{8}	square planar
[PtCl_{4}]^{2−}	pink	d^{8}	square planar

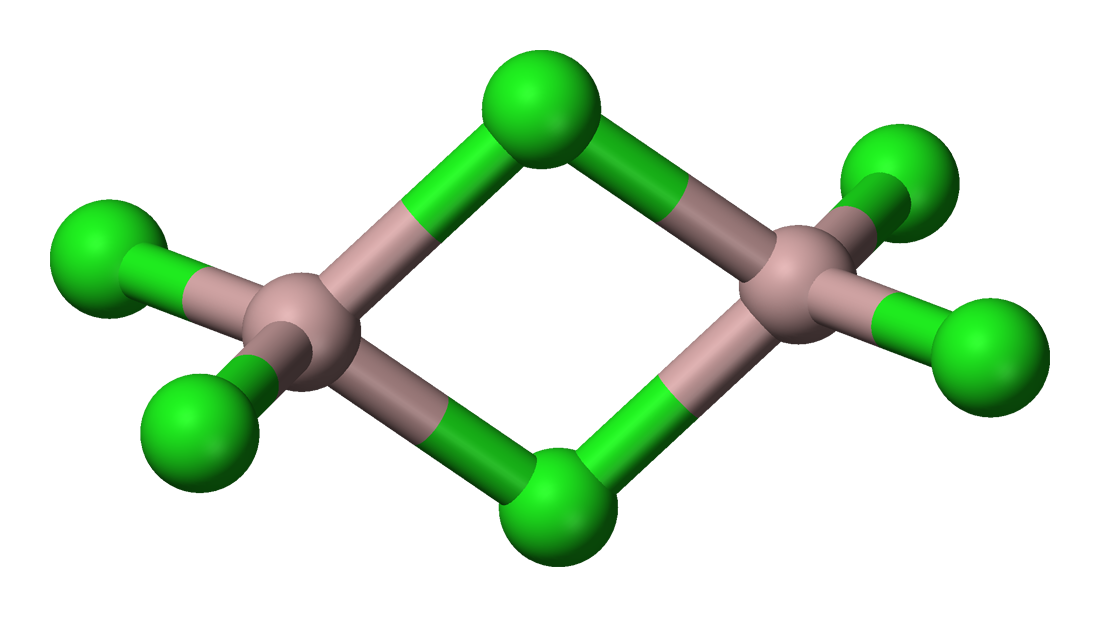
Aluminium trichloride dimer

Halides are X-type ligands in coordination chemistry. The halides are usually good σ- and good π-donors. These ligands are usually terminal, but they might act as bridging ligands as well. For example, the chloride ligands of aluminium chloride bridge two aluminium centers, thus the compound with the empirical formula AlCl_{3} actually has the molecular formula of Al_{2}Cl_{6} under ordinary conditions. Due to their π-basicity, the halide ligands are weak field ligands. Due to a smaller crystal field splitting energy, the halide complexes of the first transition series are all high spin when possible. These complexes are low spin for the second and third row transition series. Only [CrCl_{6}]^{3−} is exchange inert.

Homoleptic metal halide complexes are known with several stoichiometries, but the main ones are the hexahalometallates and the tetrahalometallates. The hexahalides adopt octahedral coordination geometry, whereas the tetrahalides are usually tetrahedral. Square planar tetrahalides are known as are examples with 2- and 3-coordination.

Alfred Werner studied hexamminecobalt(III) chloride, and was the first to propose the correct structures of coordination complexes. Cisplatin, cis-Pt(NH_{3})_{2}Cl_{2}, is a platinum drug bearing two chloride ligands. The two chloride ligands are easily displaced, allowing the platinum center to bind to two guanine units, thus damaging DNA.

Due to the presence of filled p_{π} orbitals, halide ligands on transition metals are able to reinforce π-backbonding onto a π-acid. They are also known to labilize cis-ligands.

== Applications ==
The volatility of the tetrachloride and tetraiodide complexes of Ti(IV) is exploited in the purification of titanium by the Kroll and van Arkel–de Boer processes, respectively.

Metal halides act as Lewis acids. Ferric and aluminium chlorides are catalysts for the Friedel-Crafts reaction, but due to their low cost, they are often added in stoichiometric quantities.

Chloroplatinic acid (H_{2}PtCl_{6}) is an important catalyst for hydrosilylation.

=== Precursor to inorganic compounds ===
Metal halides are often readily available precursors for other inorganic compounds. Mentioned above, the halide compounds can be made anhydrous by heat, vacuum, or treatment with thionyl chloride.

Halide ligands may be abstracted by silver(I), often as the tetrafluoroborate or the hexafluorophosphate. In many transition metal compounds, the empty coordination site is stabilized by a coordinating solvent like tetrahydrofuran. Halide ligands may also be displaced by the alkali salt of an X-type ligand, such as a salen-type ligand. This reaction is formally a transmetallation, and the abstraction of the halide is driven by the precipitation of the resultant alkali halide in an organic solvent. The alkali halides generally have very high lattice energies.

For example, sodium cyclopentadienide reacts with ferrous chloride to yield ferrocene:

2 NaC_{5}H_{5} + FeCl_{2} → Fe(C_{5}H_{5})_{2} + 2 NaCl

While inorganic compounds used for catalysis may be prepared and isolated, they may at times be generated in situ by addition of the metal halide and the desired ligand. For example, palladium chloride and triphenylphosphine may be often be used in lieu of bis(triphenylphosphine)palladium(II) chloride for palladium-catalyzed coupling reactions.

=== Lamps ===
Some halides are used in metal-halide lamps.

== See also ==
- Hard and soft acids and bases
- Alkali halides
- Silver halides
