= Copper(II) nitrate =

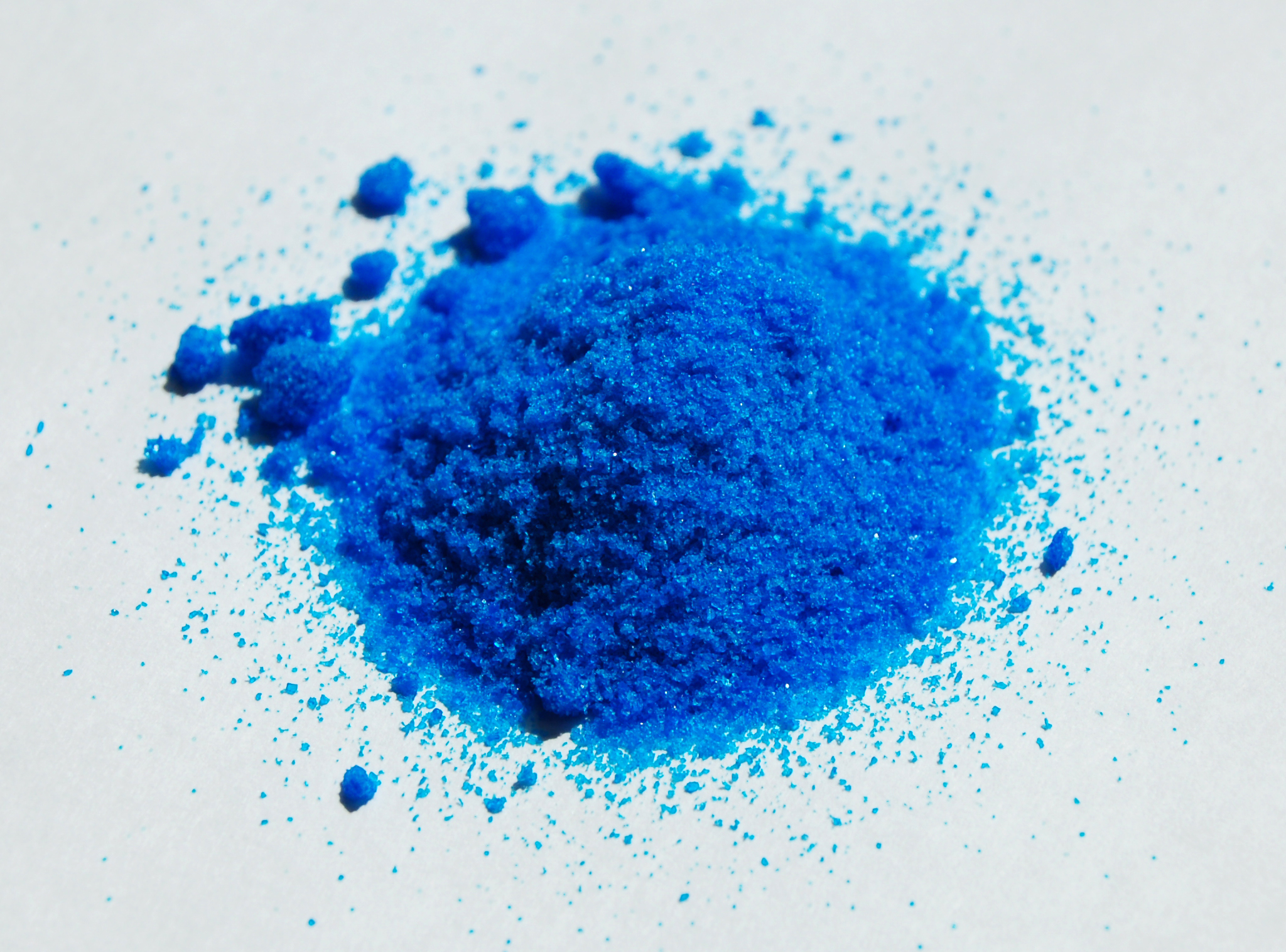
- Trihydrate

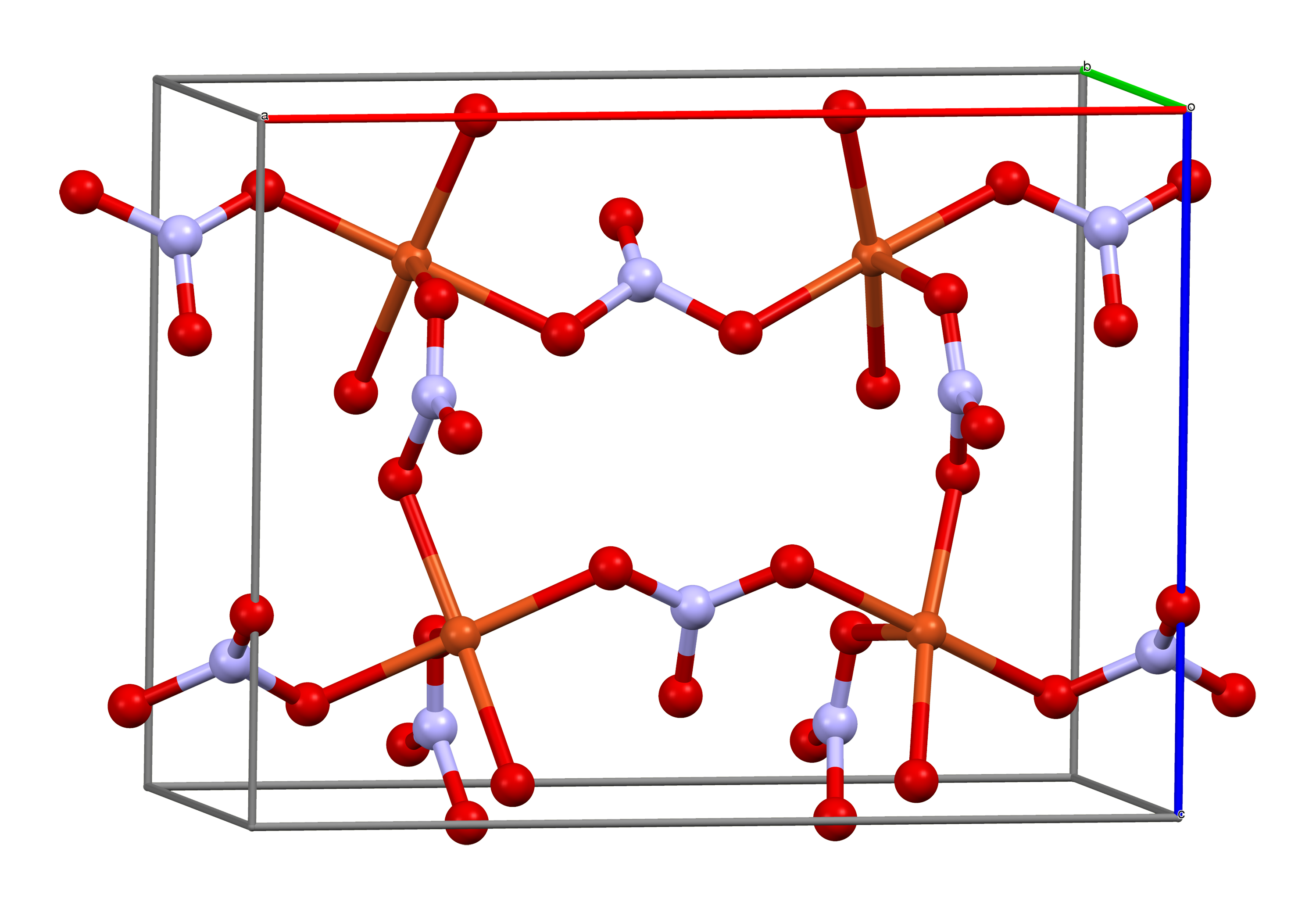
alpha polymorph
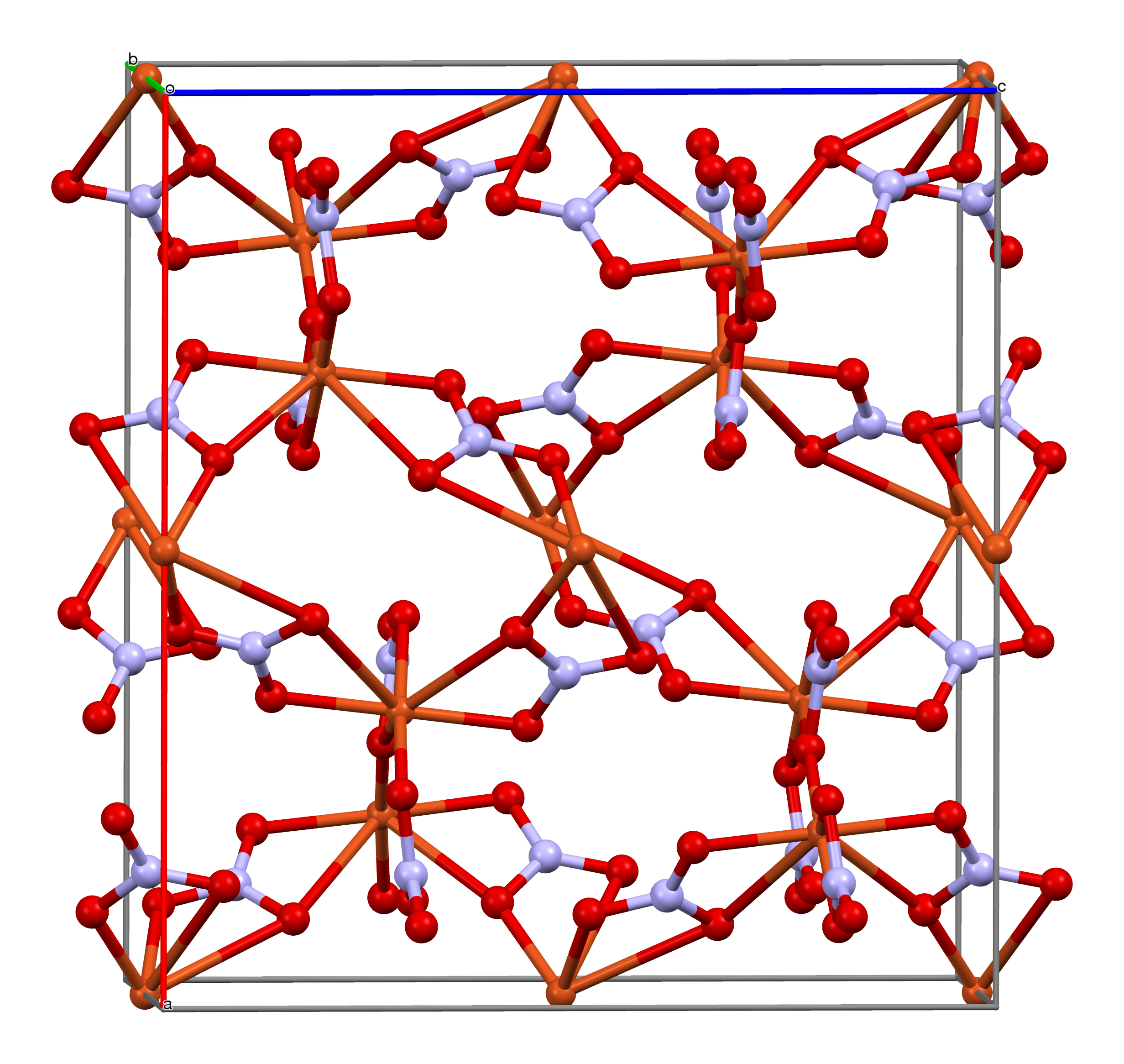
beta polymorph

Names
- IUPAC name Copper(II) nitrate
- Other names Cupric nitrate

Identifiers
CAS Number	3251-23-8; 10031-43-3 (trihydrate); 13478-38-1 (hexahydrate); 19004-19-4 (hemipentahydrate)
3D model (JSmol)	Interactive image
ChEBI	CHEBI:78036
ChemSpider	17582
ECHA InfoCard	100.019.853
PubChem CID	18616; 9837674 (trihydrate); 9839123 (hexahydrate)
RTECS number	GL7875000
UNII	9TC879S2ZV; 066PG1506T (trihydrate); 0HP2H86BS6 (hexahydrate)
CompTox Dashboard (EPA)	DTXSID7040314
- InChI: InChI=1S/Cu.2NO3/c;2*2-1(3)4/q+2;2*-1 Key: XTVVROIMIGLXTD-UHFFFAOYSA-N; InChI=1/Cu.2NO3/c;2*2-1(3)4/q+2;2*-1 Key: XTVVROIMIGLXTD-UHFFFAOYAG
- SMILES: [Cu+2].[O-][N+]([O-])=O.[O-][N+]([O-])=O

Properties
Chemical formula	Cu(NO_{3})_{2}
Molar mass	187.5558 g/mol (anhydrous); 241.60 g/mol (trihydrate); 232.591 g/mol (hemipentahydrate)
Appearance	blue-green crystals (anhydrous); blue crystals (hydrate)
Density	3.05 g/cm^{3} (anhydrous); 2.32 g/cm^{3} (trihydrate); 2.07 g/cm^{3} (hexahydrate)
Melting point	114 °C (237 °F; 387 K) (anhydrous); 80 °C (176 °F; 353 K) (trihydrate, decomposes); 26.4 °C (79.5 °F; 299.5 K) (hexahydrate, decomposes)
Boiling point	170 °C (338 °F; 443 K) (trihydrate, decomposes)
Solubility in water	trihydrate: 381 g/100 mL (40 °C (104 °F; 313 K)); 666 g/100 mL (80 °C (176 °F; 353 K)); hexahydrate: 243.7 g/100 mL (80 °C (176 °F; 353 K))
Solubility in ethanol	hydrates very soluble
Solubility in ammonia	hydrates very soluble
Magnetic susceptibility (χ)	1570.0×10^{−6} cm^{3}/mol (trihydrate)

Structure
Crystal structure	orthorhombic (anhydrous); rhombohedral (hydrates)

Hazards
- Occupational safety and health (OHS/OSH)
Main hazards	Irritant, Oxidizer
- GHS labelling
Pictograms	(GHS02: Flammable) (GHS05: Corrosive) (GHS09: Environmental hazard)
Signal word	Danger
Hazard statements	H272, H314, H410
Precautionary statements	P210, P220, P221, P260, P264, P273, P280, P301+P330+P331, P303+P361+P353, P304+P340+P310, P305+P351+P338+P310, P363, P370+P378, P391, P405, P501
NFPA 704 (fire diamond)	3 3 3 OX
- NIOSH (US health exposure limits)
PEL (Permissible)	1 mg/m^{3} (TWA, as Cu)
REL (Recommended)	1 mg/m^{3} (TWA, as Cu)
IDLH (Immediate danger)	100 mg/m^{3} (TWA, as Cu)

Related compounds
Other anions	Copper(II) sulfate; Copper(II) chloride
Other cations	Silver nitrate; Gold(III) nitrate
- Except where otherwise noted, data are given for materials in their standard state (at 25 °C [77 °F], 100 kPa). verify (what is ?) Infobox references

Copper(II) nitrate describes any member of the family of inorganic compounds with the formula Cu(NO_{3})_{2}·x(H_{2}O). The hydrates are hygroscopic blue solids. Anhydrous copper nitrate forms blue-green crystals and sublimes in a vacuum at 150–200 °C (302–392 °F). Common hydrates are the hemipentahydrate and trihydrate.

== Occurrence ==
No mineral of the ideal Cu(NO_{3}) formula, or the hydrates, are known.

Likasite, Cu_{3}(NO_{3})(OH)_{5}·2H_{2}O and buttgenbachite, Cu_{19}(NO_{3})_{2}(OH)_{32}Cl_{4}·2H_{2}O are related minerals. Natural basic copper nitrates include the rare minerals gerhardtite and rouaite, both being polymorphs of Cu_{2}(NO_{3})(OH)_{3}. A much more complex, basic, hydrated and chloride-bearing natural salt is buttgenbachite.

== Structure ==
=== Anhydrous copper(II) nitrate ===
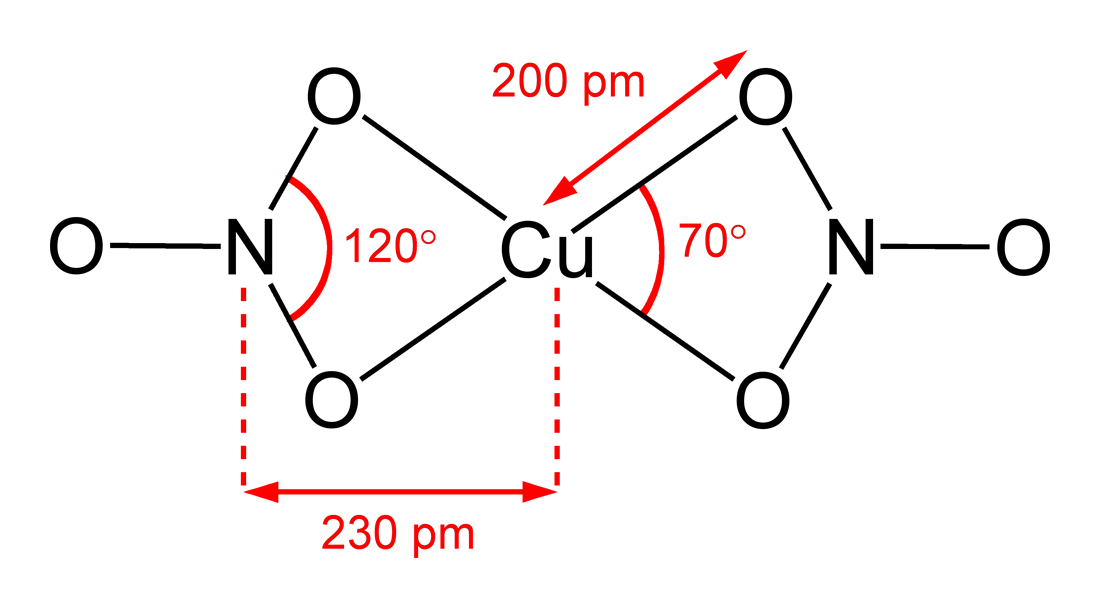
Structure of anhydrous copper(II) nitrate in the gas phase.

Two polymorphs of anhydrous copper(II) nitrate, α and β, are known. Both polymorphs are three-dimensional coordination polymer networks with infinite chains of copper(II) centers and nitrate groups. The α form has only one Cu environment, with [4+1] coordination, but the β form has two different copper centers, one with [4+1] and one that is square planar.

The nitromethane solvate also features "[4+1] coordination", with four short Cu-O bonds of approximately 200 pm and one longer bond at 240 pm.

Heating solid anhydrous copper(II) nitrate under a vacuum to 150–200 °C (302–392 °F) leads to sublimation and cracking to give a vapour of monomeric copper(II) nitrate molecules. In the vapour phase, the molecule features two bidentate nitrate ligands.

=== Hydrated copper(II) nitrate ===
Five hydrates have been reported: the monohydrate (Cu(NO_{3})_{2}·2H_{2}O), the sesquihydrate (2Cu(NO_{3})_{2}·3H_{2}O), the hemipentahydrate (Cu(NO_{3})_{2}·2.5H_{2}O), a trihydrate (Cu(NO_{3})_{2}·3H_{2}O), and a hexahydrate ([Cu(OH_{2})_{6}](NO_{3})_{2}.

The crystal structure of the hexahydrate appeared to show six almost equal Cu−O distances, not revealing the usual effect of a Jahn-Teller distortion that is otherwise characteristic of octahedral Cu(II) complexes. This non-effect was attributed to the strong hydrogen bonding that limits the elasticity of the Cu−O bonds but it is probably due to nickel being misidentified as copper in the refinement.

== Synthesis and reactions ==
=== Hydrated copper(II) nitrate ===
Hydrated copper nitrate is prepared by treating copper metal or its oxide with nitric acid:

Cu + 4 HNO_{3} → Cu(NO_{3})_{2} + 2 H_{2}O + 2 NO_{2}

The same salts can be prepared treating copper metal with an aqueous solution of silver nitrate. That reaction illustrates the ability of copper metal to reduce silver ions.

In aqueous solution, the hydrates exist as the aqua complex [Cu(H_{2}O)_{6}]^{2+}. Such complexes are highly labile and subject to rapid ligand exchange due to the d^{9} electronic configuration of copper(II).

Attempted dehydration of any of the hydrated copper(II) nitrates by heating affords the oxides, not Cu(NO_{3})_{2}. At 80 °C (176 °F) the hydrates convert to "basic copper nitrate", Cu_{2}(NO_{3})(OH)_{3}, which converts to CuO at 180 °C (356 °F). Exploiting this reactivity, copper nitrate can be used to generate nitric acid by heating it until decomposition and passing the fumes directly into water. This method is similar to the last step in the Ostwald process. The equations are as follows:

2 Cu(NO_{3})_{2} → 2 CuO + 4 NO_{2} + O_{2}
3 NO_{2} + H_{2}O → 2 HNO_{3} + NO

Treatment of copper(II) nitrate solutions with triphenylphosphine, triphenylarsine, and triphenylstibine gives the corresponding copper(I) complexes [Cu(RPh_{3})_{3}]NO_{3} (E = P, As, Sb). The group V ligand is oxidized to the oxide.

=== Anhydrous copper(II) nitrate ===
Anhydrous Cu(NO_{3})_{2} is one of the few anhydrous transition metal nitrates. It cannot be prepared by reactions containing or producing water. Instead, anhydrous Cu(NO_{3})_{2} forms when copper metal is treated with dinitrogen tetroxide:

Cu + 2 N_{2}O_{4} → Cu(NO_{3})_{2} + 2 NO

== Applications ==
Copper(II) nitrate finds a variety of applications, the main one being its conversion to copper(II) oxide, which is used as catalyst for a variety of processes in organic chemistry. Its solutions are used in textiles and polishing agents for other metals. It is often used in school laboratories to demonstrate chemical voltaic cell reactions. It is a component in some ceramic glazes and metal patinas.

=== Organic synthesis ===
Copper nitrate, in combination with acetic anhydride, is an effective reagent for nitration of aromatic compounds, known as the Menke nitration.

Hydrated copper nitrate adsorbed onto clay affords a reagent called "Claycop". The resulting blue-colored clay is used as a slurry, for example for the oxidation of thiols to disulfides. Claycop is also used to convert dithioacetals to carbonyls. A related reagent based on montmorillonite has proven useful for the nitration of aromatic compounds.

=== Electrowinning ===
Copper(II) nitrate may also be used for copper electrowinning on small scale with a ammonia (NH_{3}) as a byproduct.
