= Richard Wolffenstein =

Richard Wolffenstein may refer to:

- Richard Wolffenstein (chemist) (1864–1926), German chemist
- Richard Wolffenstein (architect) (1846–1919), German architect
