= Zincke nitration =

Named after	Theodor Zincke
Reaction type	Substitution reaction

Identifiers
RSC ontology ID	RXNO:0000413

The Zincke nitration is a nitration reaction in which a bromine is replaced by a nitro group on an electron-rich aryl compound such as a phenol or cresol. Typical reagents are nitrous acid or sodium nitrite. The reaction has historically been described as anucleophilic aromatic substitution and is named after Theodor Zincke, who first reported it in 1900. However, in 2026, Porcheddu and co-workers reported a mechanochemical variant using sodium nitrite and sodium hydrogen sulfate, for which experimental and computational evidence supported a radical pathway involving O-nitrosation, aryl nitrite fragmentation, and coupling between phenoxyl radicals and nitrogen dioxide.

Two examples:

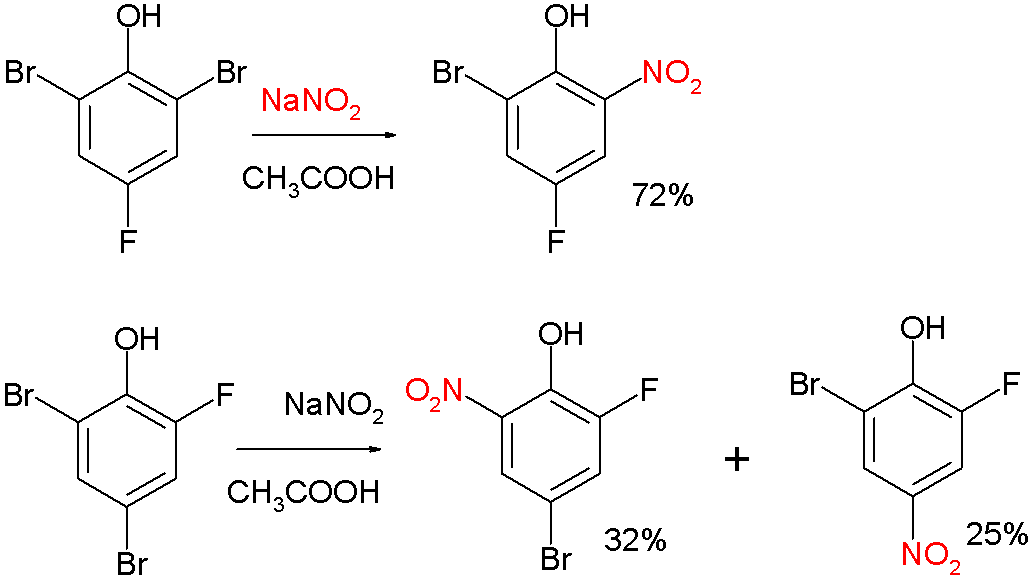
Zincke nitration

and:

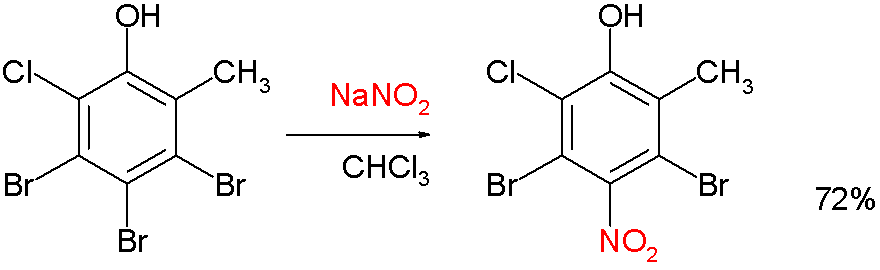
Zincke nitration

The Zincke nitration should not be confused with the Zincke–Suhl reaction or the Zincke reaction.

== See also ==
- Menke nitration
