= Zincke reaction =

Chemical reaction

Named after	Theodor Zincke
Reaction type	Coupling reaction

The Zincke reaction is an organic reaction, named after Theodor Zincke, in which a pyridine is transformed into a pyridinium salt by reaction with 2,4-dinitro-chlorobenzene and a primary amine.

The Zincke reaction

The Zincke reaction should not be confused with the Zincke-Suhl reaction or the Zincke nitration. Furthermore, the Zincke reaction has nothing to do with the chemical element zinc.

== Reaction mechanism ==
The first reaction is the formation of the N-2,4-dinitrophenyl-pyridinium salt (2). This salt is typically isolated and purified by recrystallization.

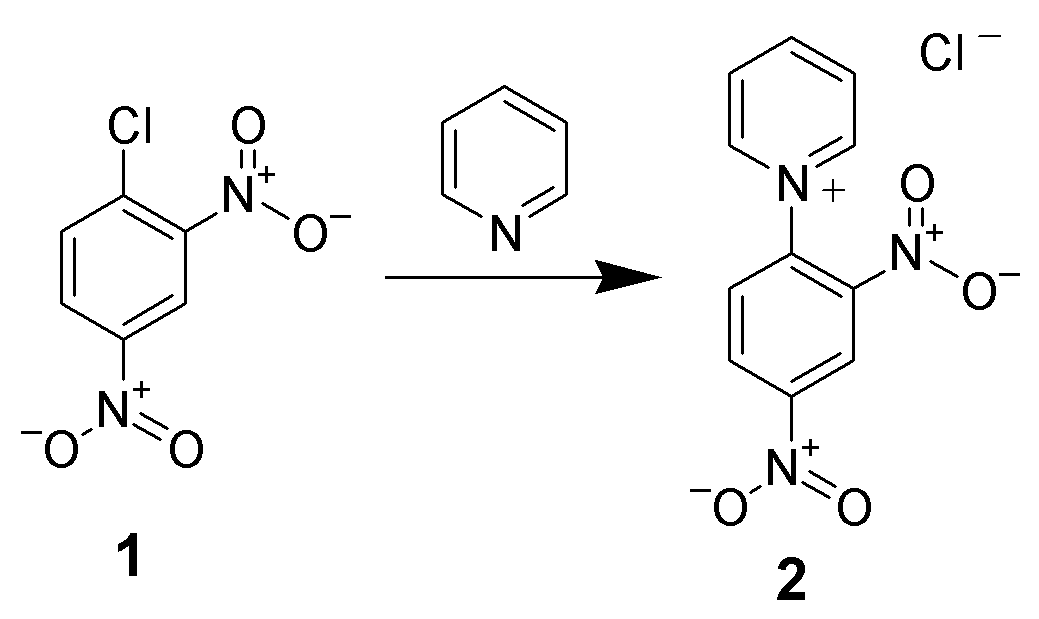
The formation of the DNP-pyridinium salt

Upon heating a primary amine with the N-2,4-dinitrophenyl-pyridinium salt (2), the addition of the amine leads to the opening of the pyridinium ring. A second addition of amine leads to the displacement of 2,4-dinitroaniline (5) and formation of the König salt (6a and 6b). The trans-cis-trans isomer of the König salt (6a) can react by either sigmatropic rearrangement or nucleophilic addition of a zwitterionic intermediate to give cyclized intermediate (7). This has been suggested to be the rate-determining step. After proton transfer and amine elimination, the desired pyridinium ion (9) is formed.

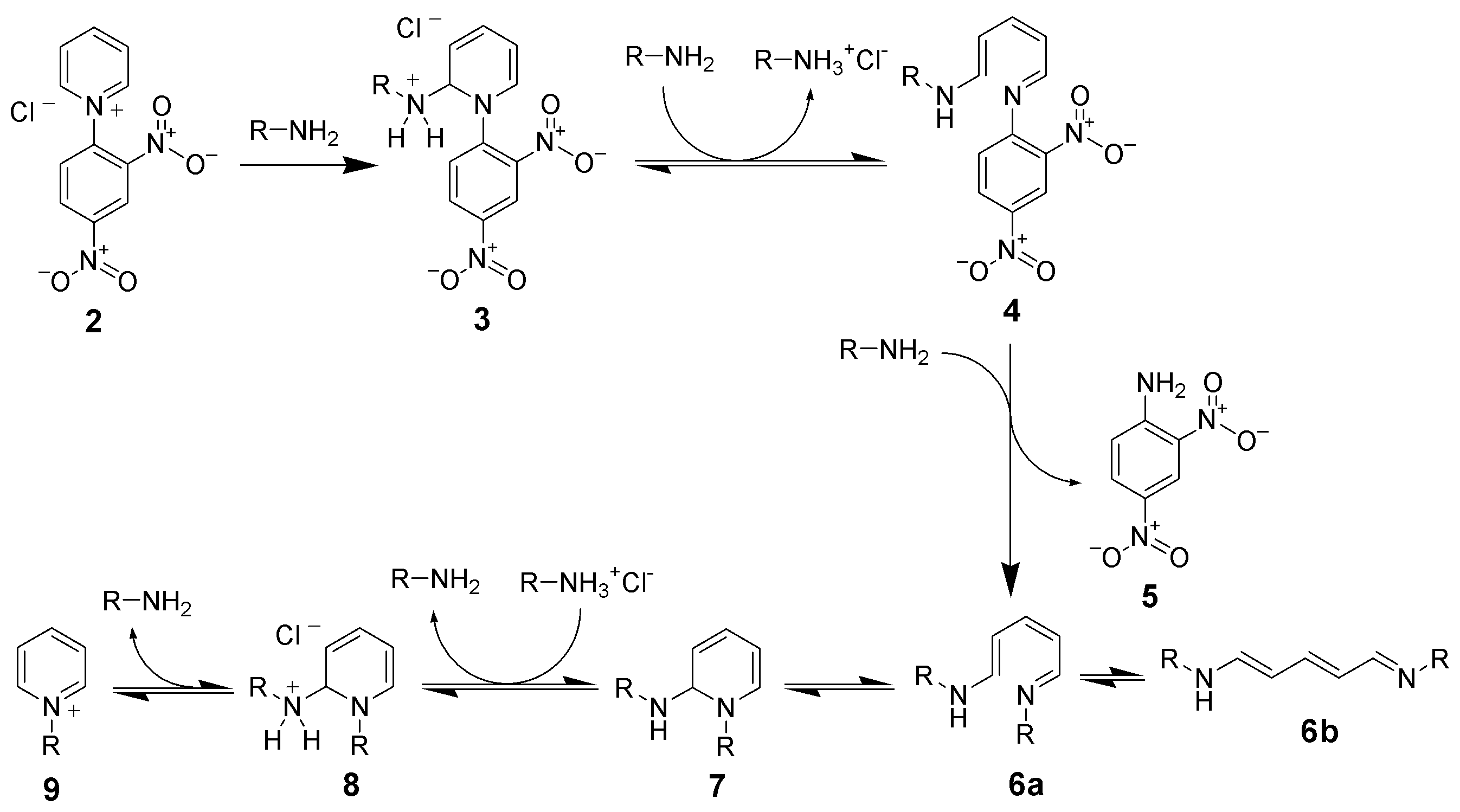
The mechanism of the Zincke reaction

This mechanism can be referred to as an instance of the ANRORC mechanism: nucleophilic addition (A_{N}), ring opening and ring closing.

== Applications ==
In one solid-phase synthesis application, the amine is covalently attached to Wang resin.

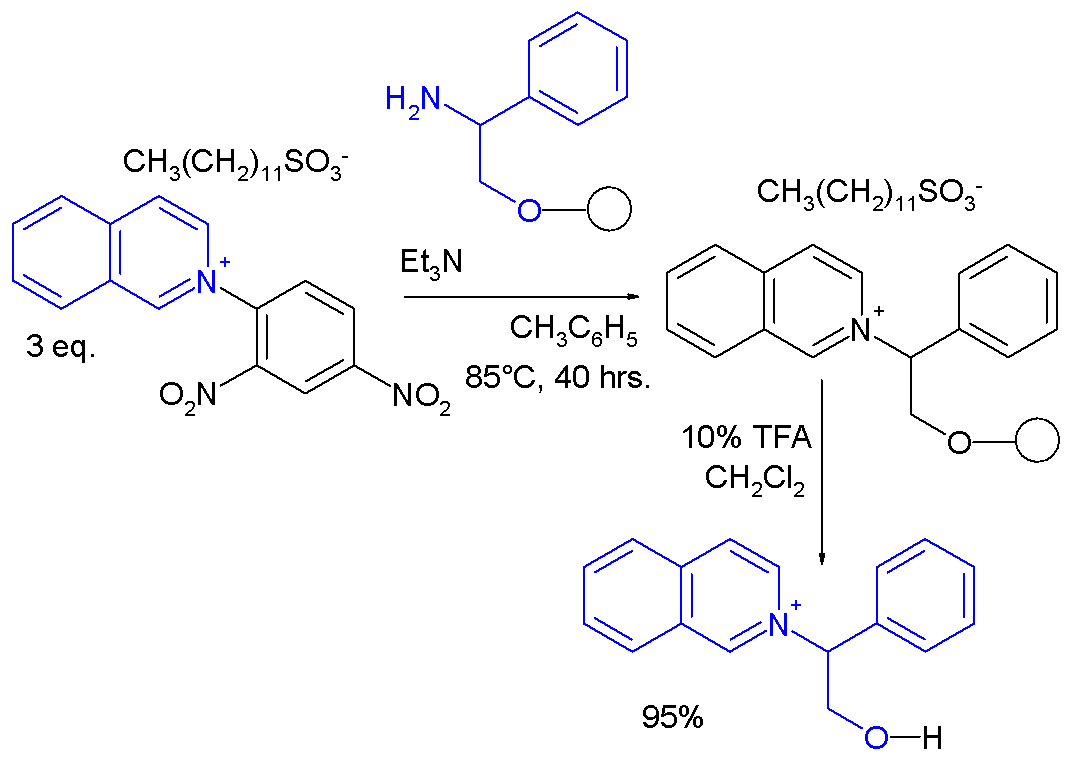
The Zincke reaction

Another example is the synthesis of a chiral isoquinolinium salt.

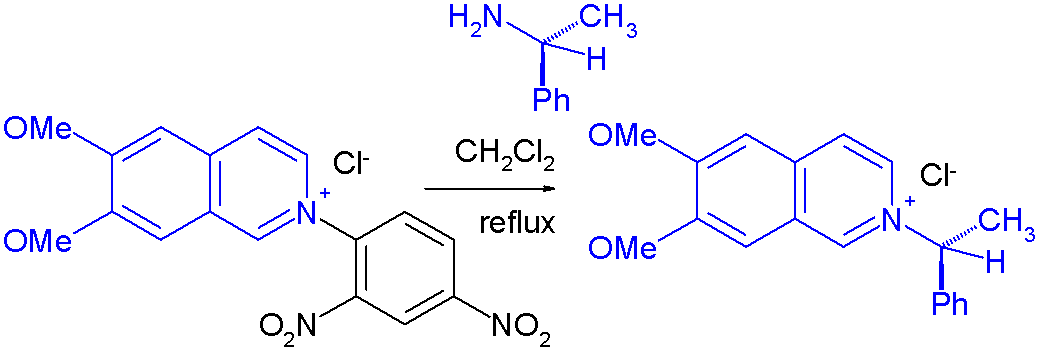
The Zincke reaction

== Zincke aldehydes ==
With secondary amines and not primary amines the Zincke reaction takes on a different shape forming so-called Zincke aldehydes in which the pyridine ring is ring-opened with the terminal iminium group hydrolyzed to an aldehyde:

Zincke aldehydes

This variation has been applied in the synthesis of novel indoles:

Zincke aldehydes Kearney 2006

with cyanogen bromide mediated pyridine activation.

== 2007 rediscovery ==
In 2006 and again in 2007 the Zincke reaction was rediscovered by a research group from Japan and a group from the USA. Both groups claimed the synthesis of a 12 membered diazaannulene (structure 1) from an N-aryl pyridinium chloride and an amine, an aniline in the case of the Japanese group (depicted below) and an aliphatic amine (anticipating surfactant properties) in the case of the American group.

In a letter to Angewandte Chemie, the German chemist Manfred Christl pointed out not only that the alleged new chemistry was in fact 100-year-old Zincke chemistry but also that the proposed structure for the reaction product was not the 12 membered ring but the 6 membered pyridinium salt (structure 2). Initially both groups conceded that they had ignored existing literature on Zincke but held on to the annulene structure based on their electrospray ionization (ESI) results which according to them clearly showed dimer. In his letter Christl remarked that in ESI measurements association of molecules is a common phenomenon. In addition, he noted similarities in melting point and NMR spectroscopy.

As of December 2007 the Japanese group retracted its paper in Organic Letters due to uncertainties regarding what products are formed in the reaction described and the US group added a correction to theirs in the Angewandte Chemie stating they wish(ed) to alter the proposed structure of (the) annulene. The issue did receive some media coverage:
