= Zincke aldehyde =

Zincke aldehydes, or 5-aminopenta-2,4-dienals, are the product of the reaction of a pyridinium salt with two equivalents of any secondary amine, followed by basic hydrolysis. Using secondary amines (as opposed to primary amines) the Zincke reaction takes on a different shape forming Zincke aldehydes in which the pyridine ring is ring-opened with the terminal iminium group hydrolyzed to an aldehyde. The use of the dinitrophenyl group for pyridine activation was first reported by Theodor Zincke. The use of cyanogen bromide for pyridine activation was independently reported by W. König:

Zincke aldehydes

The synthesis and utility of Zincke aldehydes has been reviewed.

A variation of the Zincke reaction has been applied in the synthesis of novel indoles:

Zincke aldehydes Kearney 2006

with cyanogen bromide mediated pyridine activation (König method).

More recently, an interesting rearrangement of Zincke aldehydes to Z-unsaturated amides was discovered serendipitously while trying to do an intramolecular Diels-Alder reaction. The rearrangement gives the Z-product stereospecifically. In a follow-up paper, allylic amines were used and gave products of a rearrangement / intramolecular Diels-Alder cascade. Mechanistic details were also discussed, however further investigations in collaboration with the Houk group revealed an unusual and unexpected mechanism based on computational studies. The new mechanism involves formation of a vinyl ketene.

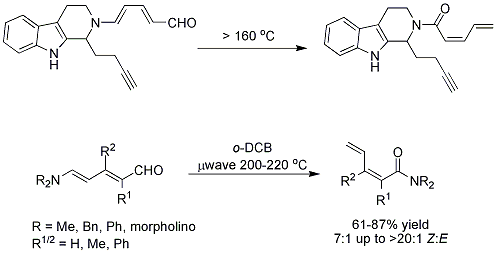
Rearrangement of Zincke aldehydes to Z-unsaturated amides

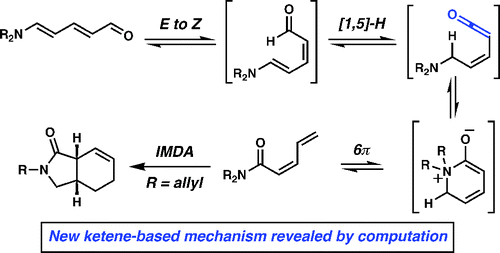
New ketene-based mechanism for rearrangement of Zincke aldehydes

The Vanderwal group has also reported the synthesis of 4-stannyldienals from Zincke aldehydes by addition of tributylstannyl anion and quenching with acetyl chloride. The products are useful substrates for Stille cross-coupling reactions to give interesting polyene structures.

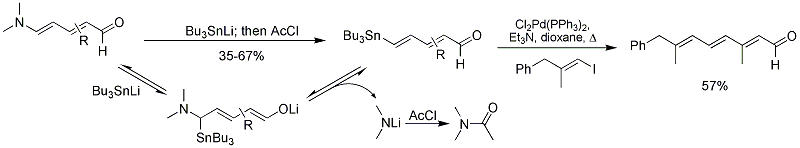
Formation of stannyldienals from Zincke aldehydes

In 2009, the Vanderwal group reported another interesting rearrangement of Zincke aldehydes. Tryptamine-derived Zincke aldehydes are heated with strong base to give the rearranged enal as shown below. This reaction was the key step in their total synthesis of norfluorocurarine, a Strychnos alkaloid. This strategy was also employed in a short synthesis of strychnine, becoming the shortest synthesis of strychnine reported to date at only six linear steps. This works has been highlighted on the blog Totally Synthetic.

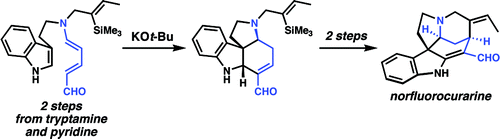
Formal cycloaddition of Zincke aldehydes

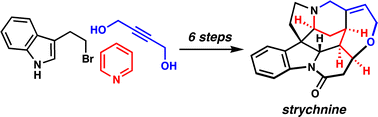
Vanderwal synthesis of strychnine

Also in 2009, the first reports of Zincke aldehydes undergoing a Pictet-Spengler reaction appeared from the group of Christian Marazano. This reaction provided the tetrahydro-β-carboline or tetrahydroisoquinoline core present in many alkaloid natural products, and was applied to the construction of a known intermediate in a previous total synthesis.

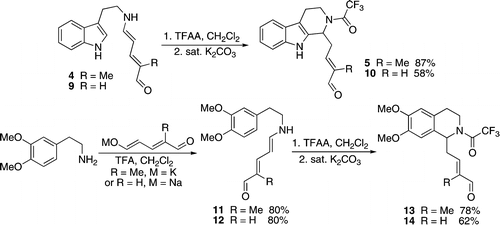
N-Acyl Pictet−Spengler Reaction by Treatment of Tryptamine and Homoveratrylamine Derived Aminopentadienals with TFAA

One drawback of the Zincke Aldehyde synthesis is the need for 2 equivalents of the amine in the initial pyridine ring opening reaction. This is of particular concern for the case of complex secondary amines required for natural product synthesis. The group of Marazano recently found an alternative synthesis by condensation onto a variety of glutaconaldehyde derivatives using TFA. This solution has greatly simplified the production and purification of complex Zincke aldehydes.
