= Menke nitration =

Named after	J. B. Menke
Reaction type	Substitution reaction

The Menke nitration is the nitration of electron rich aromatic compounds with cupric nitrate and acetic anhydride. The reaction introduces the nitro group predominantly in the ortho position to the activation group. It may proceed via the intermediary of acetyl nitrate. The reaction is named after the Dutch chemist J.B. Menke.

== See also ==
- Zincke nitration
