= ANRORC mechanism =

Reaction mechanism in ring systems

The ANRORC mechanism in organic chemistry describes a special type of substitution reaction. ANRORC stands for Addition of the Nucleophile, Ring Opening, and Ring Closure in nucleophilic attack on ring systems and it helps to explain product formation and distribution in some nucleophilic substitutions especially in heterocyclic compounds. It is widely used in medicinal chemistry.

This reaction mechanism has been extensively studied in reactions of metal amide nucleophiles (such as sodium amide) and substituted pyrimidines (for instance 4-phenyl-6-bromopyrimidine 1) in ammonia at low temperatures. The main reaction product is 4-phenyl-6-aminopyrimidine 2 with the bromine substituent replaced by an amine. This rules out the formation of an aryne intermediate A which would also give the 5-substituted isomer.

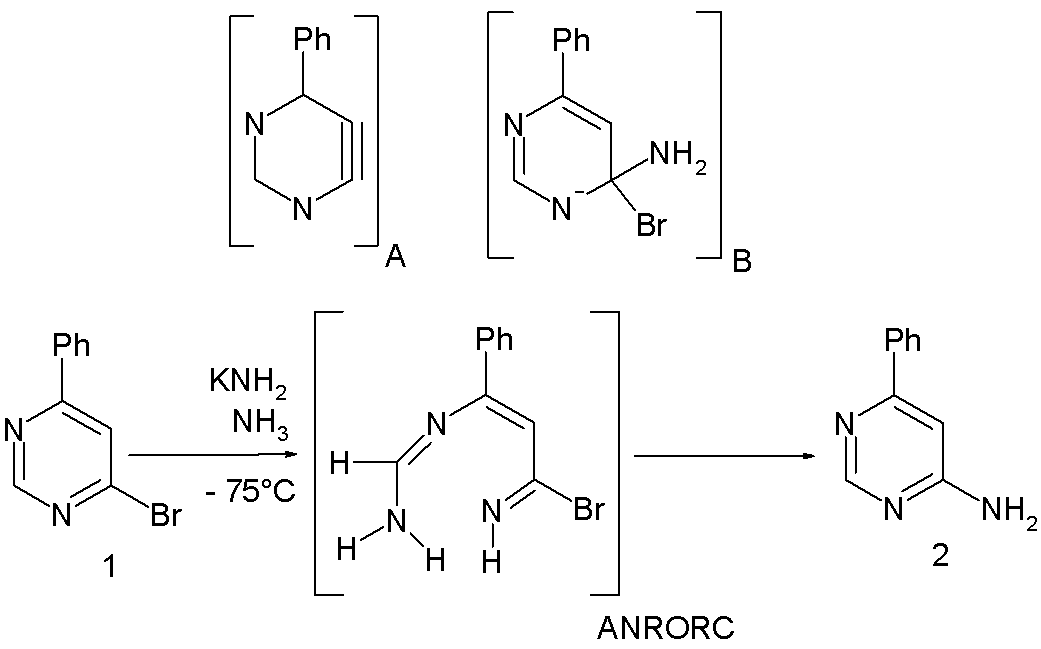
ANRORC overview

The exclusion of a second intermediate in this reaction, the Meisenheimer complex B in favor of the ring-opened ANRORC intermediate is based on several pieces of evidence. With other amines such as piperidine the ring-opened compound after loss of hydrogen bromide to the nitrile is also the isolated reaction product:

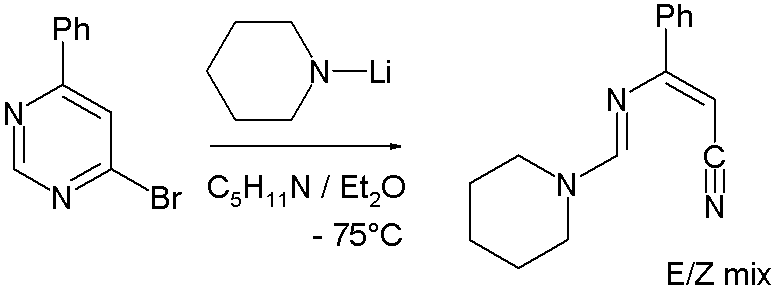
ANRORC isolation

More evidence is gained by isotope labeling with deuterium at C5:

The deuterium atom is no longer present in the reaction product and this is again explained by the ANRORC mechanism where the ring-opened intermediate 4 is a tautomeric pair enabling fast H-D exchange:

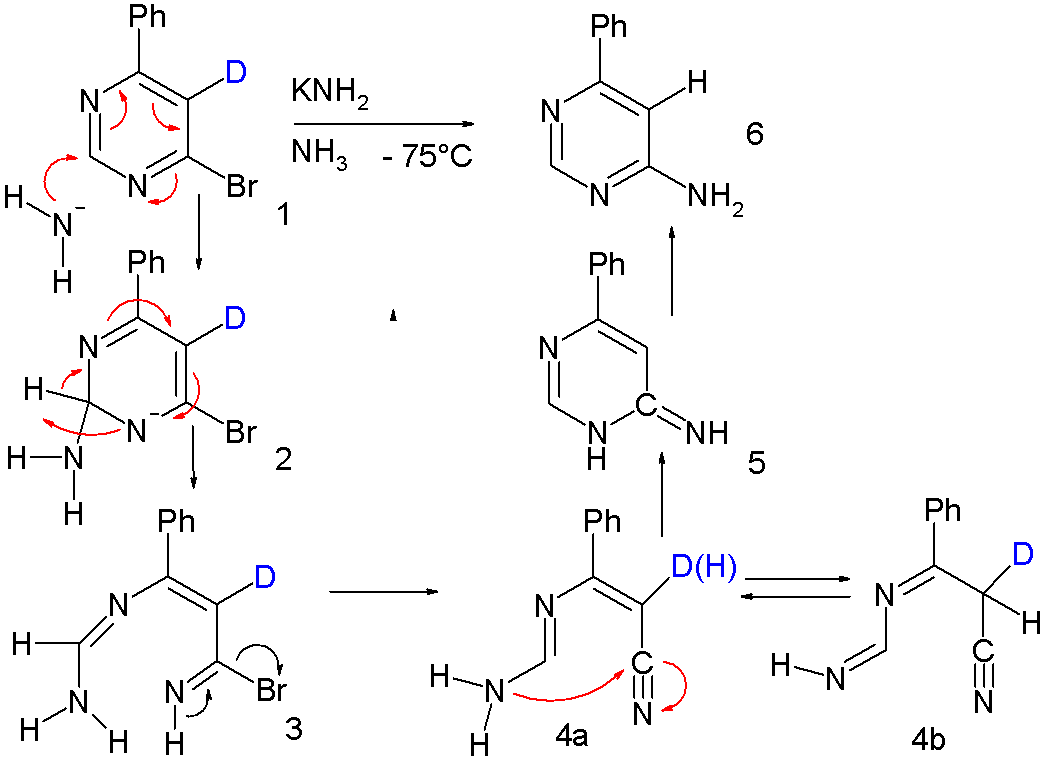
ANRORC isotope labelling

The final piece of evidence is provided by an isotope scrambling experiment with both nitrogen atoms in the pyrimidine core replaced by the ^{14}N isotope to a degree of 3% each:

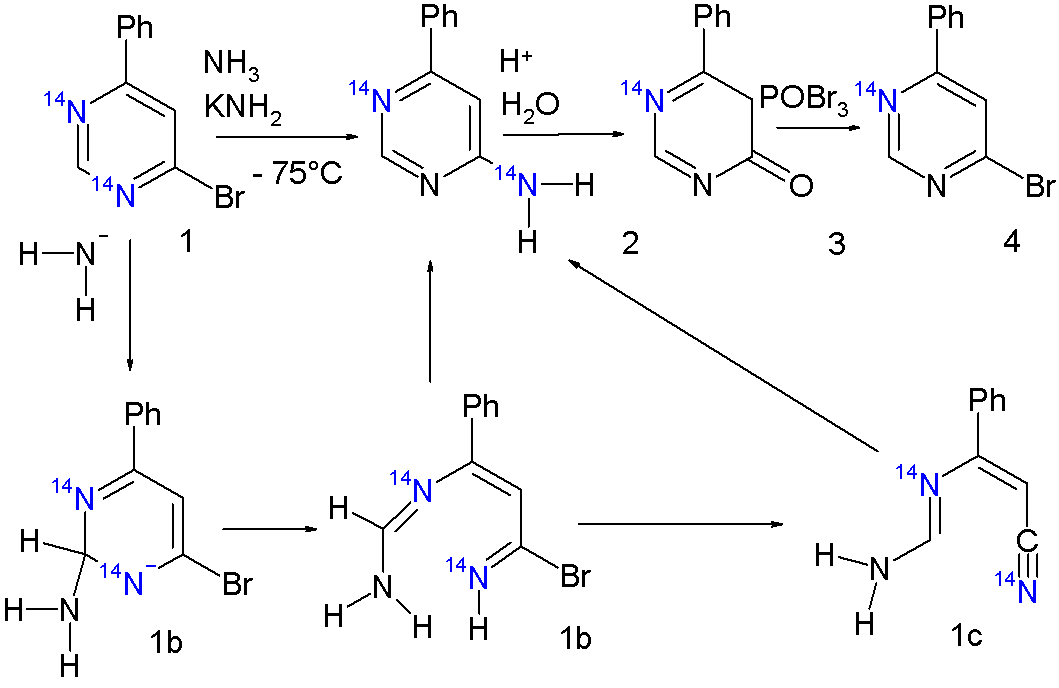
ANRORC isotope scrambling

In the final product 4 (reversed to the reactant, after acid hydrolysis and bromination of 2) roughly half the isotope content is lost, clearly demonstrating that one internal nitrogen atom has been displaced to an external nitrogen atom.

The Zincke reaction is a named reaction involving an ANRORC mechanism.
