= Theodor Zincke =

German chemist (1843–1928)

Ernst Zincke
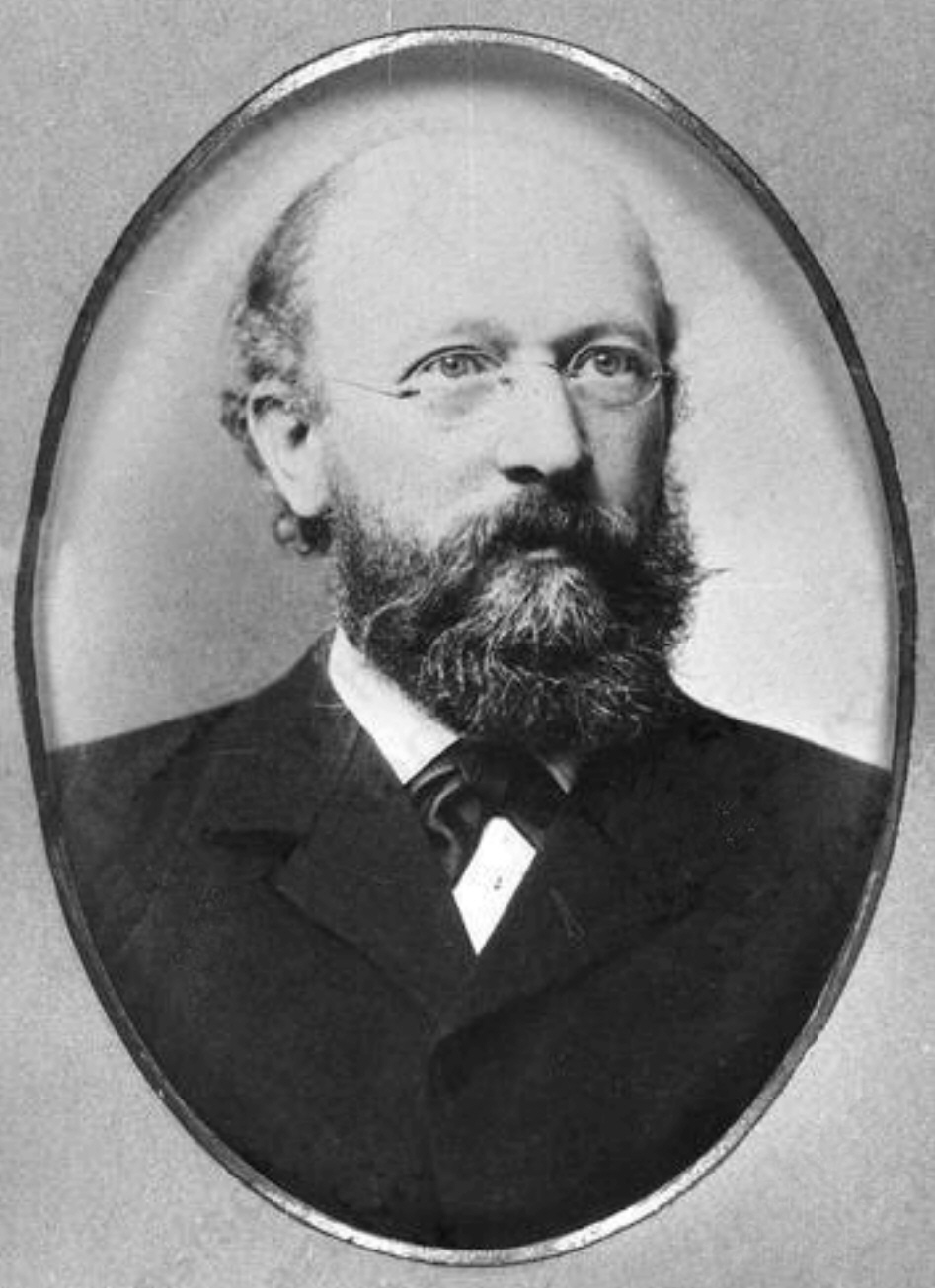
- Theodor Zincke (1900)
- Born: Ernst Carl Theodor Zincke; 19 May 1843; Uelzen, Kingdom of Hanover
- Died: 17 March 1928 (aged 84); Marburg, Province of Hesse-Nassau, Free State of Prussia, Germany
- Education: University of Göttingen
- Known for: Zincke aldehyde Zincke nitration Zincke reaction Zincke–Suhl reaction
- Scientific career
- Workplaces: University of Bonn; University of Marburg
- Doctoral advisor: Friedrich Wöhler; August Kekulé
- Doctoral students: Otto Hahn; Karl Theophil Fries; Alfred Walter Stewart

Ernst Carl Theodor Zincke (19 May 1843 – 17 March 1928) was a German chemist and the academic adviser of Otto Hahn.

== Life ==
Theodor Zincke was born in Uelzen on 19 May 1843. He became a pharmacist and graduated in Göttingen with his Staatsexamen. He began studying chemistry with Friedrich Wöhler and received his Ph.D in 1869. He joined the group of August Kekulé at the University of Bonn, and in 1875 became professor at the University of Marburg where he remained until his retirement in 1913. He developed Zincke reaction, Zincke–Suhl reaction in 1906 (together with R. Suhl) and in 1900 Zincke nitration. Theodor Zincke died on 17 March 1928 in Marburg.
