= Gold(III) hydroxide =

Names
- Systematic IUPAC name Gold(3+) trihydroxide
- Other names Auric acid Gold hydroxide Gold trihydroxide

Identifiers
CAS Number	1303-52-2
3D model (JSmol)	Interactive image; Interactive image
ChemSpider	21170948
ECHA InfoCard	100.013.746
EC Number	215-120-0
PubChem CID	11536100
UNII	8YE7R9L22G
CompTox Dashboard (EPA)	DTXSID2061646
- InChI: InChI=1S/Au.3H2O/h;3*1H2/q+3;;;/p-3 Key: WDZVNNYQBQRJRX-UHFFFAOYSA-K
- SMILES: O[Au](O)O; [OH-].[OH-].[OH-].[Au+3]

Properties
Chemical formula	H_{3}AuO_{3}
Molar mass	247.9886 g mol^{−1}
Appearance	Vivid, dark yellow crystals
Solubility in water	0.00007 g/100 g
Acidity (pK_{a})	<11.7, 13.36, >15.3

Structure
Molecular shape	Trigonal dihedral at Au

Hazards
- GHS labelling
Pictograms	(GHS07: Exclamation mark)
Signal word	Warning
Hazard statements	H315, H319, H335
Safety data sheet (SDS)	Oxford

Related compounds
Related compounds	Gold(III) chloride Copper(II) hydroxide Gold(III) oxide
- Except where otherwise noted, data are given for materials in their standard state (at 25 °C [77 °F], 100 kPa). verify (what is ?) Infobox references

Gold(III) hydroxide, gold trihydroxide, or gold hydroxide is an inorganic compound, a hydroxide of gold, with formula Au(OH)_{3}. It is also called auric acid with formula H_{3}AuO_{3}. It is easily dehydrated above 140 °C to gold(III) oxide. Salts of auric acid are termed aurates.

Gold hydroxide is used in medicine, porcelain making, gold plating, and daguerrotypes. Gold hydroxide deposited on suitable carriers can be used for preparation of gold catalysts.

Gold hydroxide is a product of electrochemical corrosion of gold metalization subjected to moisture and positive electric potential; it is one of the corrosion failure modes of microelectronics. Voluminous gold hydroxide is produced from gold metalization; after the layer grows thick it may spall, and the conductive particles may cause short circuits or leakage paths. The decreased thickness of the gold layer may also lead to an increase in its electrical resistance, which can also lead to electrical failure.

== Preparation and reactions ==
Gold(III) hydroxide is produced by the reaction of chloroauric acid with an alkali, such as sodium hydroxide:

HAuCl_{4} + 4NaOH → Au(OH)_{3} + 4NaCl + H_{2}O

Gold(III) hydroxide reacts with ammonia to produce fulminating gold, an explosive compound.

It also reacts with an alkali to produce aurates(AuO_{2}^{−}).
