= Bohn–Schmidt reaction =

Chemical reaction

The Bohn–Schmidt reaction, a named reaction in chemistry, introduces a hydroxy group at an anthraquinone system. The anthraquinone must already have at least one hydroxy group. The reaction was first described in 1889 by René Bohn (1862–1922) and in 1891 by Robert Emanuel Schmidt (1864–1938), two German industrial chemists.

Bohn–Schmidt reaction ÜV5

René Bohn is one of the few industrial chemists after whom a reaction is named. In 1901, he made indanthrone from 2-aminoanthraquinone and thus laid the basis for a new group of dyes.

== Reaction mechanism ==
The postulated reaction mechanism is explained below for the example of 2-hydroxyanthraquinone:

Bohn–Schmidt reaction mechanism

The sulfuric acid protonates the keto group of the anthraquinone 1. This causes a shift of the electrons to the oxonium ion in molecule 2. This shift enables the sulfuric acid to attack the carbenium ion 3 which is formed. The sulfuric acid oxidizes the resulting hydroxyanthracenone 5, which is then protonated and the reaction starts all over again. Finally, polyhydroxyanthraquinones with different numbers of hydroxy groups are obtained. The reaction proceeds best at 25–50 °C and takes up to several weeks to complete.

The presence of a catalyst such as selenium or mercury accelerate the reaction. By adding boric acid, sulfuric acid can be used instead of fuming sulfuric acid. If boric acid is used, it has a regulating effect as ester formation occurs, which prevents further oxidation.

== Atom economy ==
The reaction is ideally suited for the general production of multi-hydroxyated anthraquinones due to the good atom economy. Sulfuric acid can be reused, as it is split off at the very end. The reaction is therefore used in many dye production processes. The only disadvantage is that in case boric acid is used, esterification occurs, which must then be reverted (hydrolyzed).

== See also ==
- Wolffenstein–Böters reaction
