= Nitration =

Chemical reaction which adds a nitro (–NO2) group onto a molecule

In organic chemistry, nitration refers to a chemical processes which introduce the −NO_{2} moiety to an organic compound. Depending on substrate, the product is either a nitro group, nitramide, or nitrate ester.

The technology is long-standing and mature, and has many major industrial applications. The volumetrically most important is aromatic nitration, in which a nitronium ion equivalent attacks an aromatic ring. Nitroaromats are produced annually on the megaton scale, the feedstocks for virtually all aromatic amine (aniline) production.

Nitration reactions are also central to explosives manufacture, because the −NO_{2} moiety is an explosophore. Examples include the conversion of guanidine to nitroguanidine and toluene to trinitrotoluene (TNT).

== Aromatic nitration ==
Typical aromatic nitrations rely on a reagent called "mixed acid", a mixture of concentrated nitric acid and sulfuric acids. The reaction has been called "probably the most potentially hazardous industrially operated unit process" because thermal runaway is difficult to avoid. For benzene nitration, the reaction temperature is controlled to not exceed 50 °C.

The active ingredient in mixed acid is the nitronium ion (NO_{2}^{+}), also isolable as the nitrating agent nitronium tetrafluoroborate. Sulfuric acid is not consumed, acting as a desiccating catalyst.

Aromatic nitration is generally accepted to occur through electrophilic aromatic substitution on the electron-rich benzene ring:

This has been difficult to rationalize with certain competition experiments: whichever NO^{±,0}_{2} intermediate is involved cannot distinguish between electron-poor and electron-rich rings. Alternative mechanisms, including single electron transfer (SET) have been proposed.

On the other hand, any proposed reactive intermediate must have a very strong preference for electrophilically activated sites on the ring. For example, nitration of nitrobenzene gives all three isomers of dinitrobenzenes in a ratio of 93% meta, 6% ortho, and 1% para.

The current understanding of the reaction is that the nitronium ion and arene initially associate in a (half-sandwich) π complex. This barrier-free diffusion-controlled association is rapid and unselective. Reorganization to form the Wheland intermediate then requires solvent relaxation, which is slow enough to produce the observed site selectivity.

== Scope ==
In addition to regioselectivity, the degree of nitration is of interest. Fluorenone, for example, can be selectively trinitrated or tetranitrated.

Often alternative products act as contaminants or are simply wasted. Considerable attention thus is paid to optimization of the reaction conditions. For example, the mixed acid can be derived from phosphoric or perchloric acids in place of sulfuric acid.

=== Alternatives to nitric acid ===
Mixture of nitric and acetic acids or nitric acid and acetic anhydride is commercially important in the production of RDX, as amines are destructed by sulfuric acid. Acetyl nitrate had also been used as a nitration agent.

In the Wolffenstein–Böters reaction, benzene reacts with nitric acid and mercury(II) nitrate to give picric acid.

In the second half of the 20th century, new reagents were developed for laboratory usage, mainly N-nitro heterocyclic compounds.

=== Ipso nitration ===
With aryl chlorides, triflates and nonaflates, ipso nitration may also take place. The phrase ipso nitration was first used by Perrin and Skinner in 1971, in an investigation into chloroanisole nitration. In one protocol, 4-chloro-n-butylbenzene is reacted with sodium nitrite in t-butanol in the presence of 0.5 mol% Pd_{2}(dba)_{3}, a biarylphosphine ligand and a phase-transfer catalyst to provide 4-nitro-n-butylbenzene.

== See also ==
- Menke nitration
- Zincke nitration
- Reactive nitrogen species
