= Fulminating gold =

Chemical substance

Fulminating gold is a light- and shock-sensitive yellow to yellow-orange amorphous heterogeneous mixture of different polymeric compounds of predominantly gold(III), ammonia, and chlorine that cannot be described by a chemical formula. Here, "fulminating" has its oldest meaning, "explosive" (from Latin fulmen, lightning, from verb fulgeo, 'I shine'); the material contains no fulminate ions. The best approximate description is that it is the product of partial hydrolysis of a three-dimensional coordination polymer 3
∞ [Au_{2}(μ_{2}-NH_{2})(μ_{3}-NH)_{2}]Cl. Upon detonation, it produces a purple smoke. The complex has a square planar molecular geometry with a low spin state.

Generally, it is best to avoid accidentally creating this substance by mixing gold(III) chloride or hydroxide salts with ammonia gas or ammonium salts, as it is prone to explosion with even the slightest touch.

== History ==
Fulminating gold was the first high explosive known, and was noted in western alchemy as early as 1585. Sebald Schwaerzer was the first to isolate this compound and comment on its characteristics in his book Chrysopoeia Schwaertzeriana. Schwaerzer's production required dissolving a sample of gold in aqua regia, adding ammonium chloride to the saturated solution, and precipitating the solution through lead spheres and drying over oil of tartar. Chemists of the 16th and 17th centuries were very interested in the novelty of an explosive gold compound, and many chemists of the era were injured upon its detonation. Jöns Jacob Berzelius, a leading chemist of the early 19th century was one such person. He had a beaker explode in his hand, damaging it and his eyes for several years. It wasn't until Johann Rudolf Glauber in the 17th century that fulminating gold started to have uses. He used the purple fumes after detonation to plate objects in gold. Later on, it was used in photography because of its light-sensitive nature.

In the 18th and 19th centuries, work continued on finding the chemical formula for fulminating gold. Carl Wilhelm Scheele found and proved that ammonia was what drove the formation of the complex and that upon detonation the gas formed was primarily nitrogen gas. Jean Baptiste Dumas went further and found that in addition to gold and nitrogen, fulminating gold also had hydrogen and chlorine in it. He then decomposed a ground sample with copper(II) oxide to find that it was a salt with an ammonium cation and a gold nitrogen complex as the anion. Ernst Weitz continued studying the compound with state of the art techniques and concluded that fulminating gold was a mixture of "diamido-imido-aurichloride" and 2Au(OH)_{3}·3NH_{3}. He managed to ignore the poor solubility of the complex in most solvents, but noted that it did dissolve readily in aqueous gold(III), ammonia, and chloride systems. His conclusion on the formula proved to be incorrect but offered a fair estimate for later scientists to jump from.

== Current knowledge ==
Due to the massive interest in the study of fulminating gold in the early and middling eras of chemistry, there are many ways to synthesize it. Not all synthesis routes yield the same product. According to Steinhauser et al. and Ernst Weitz, a very homogeneous sample can be obtained by hydrolysis of [Au(NH_{3})_{4}](NO_{3})_{3} with Cl^{−}. They have also noted that different synthetic routes, as well as using different amount of ammonia when precipitating the product, leads to different ratios of Au, N, H, and Cl. Due to its physical and chemical properties, fulminating gold cannot be crystallized under normal methods, making determining the crystal structure very difficult. From extensive attempts at crystallization by Steinhauser et al. and vibrational spectroscopy, it has been concluded that fulminating gold is an amorphous mixture of polymeric compounds that are linked via μ_{2}-NH_{2} and μ_{3}-NH bridges. It has also been found that fulminating gold is also very slightly soluble in acetonitrile and dimethylformamide.

EXAFS (Extended X-Ray Absorption Fine Structure) spectra indicate each gold atom is coordinated by four nitrogen atoms at a distance of 202 pm, in a symmetric square planar arrangement similar to tetraamminegold(III). This geometry is supported by the diamagnetic character of fulminating gold. Since it has a d^{8} electron configuration and is diamagnetic, it must have a square planar geometry. These spectra are consistent with models of the second coordination sphere containing either four or one gold atoms, together with other ligands.

The unusual colouration of the smoke is caused by the presence of heterogenous spherical gold nanoparticles of diameters 5–300+ nm.

== Uses ==
Due to the explosive tendency of this compound, industrial techniques for extracting and purifying gold compounds are very few. There was a novel biogas extraction of precious metals from scrapped electronics that worked very well, but the creation of fulminating gold and other precious metal amines limits its widespread use. However, there are patents and methods that use fulminating gold as an intermediate in a process of turning low-purity gold into high-purity gold for electronics.
