= Intramolecular Diels–Alder cycloaddition =

Reaction in organic chemistry

In organic chemistry, an intramolecular Diels-Alder cycloaddition is a Diels–Alder reaction in which the diene and the dienophile are both part of the same molecule. The reaction leads to the formation of the cyclohexene-like structure as usual for a Diels–Alder reaction, but as part of a more complex fused or bridged cyclic ring system. This reaction can gives rise to various natural derivatives of decalin.

== Reaction products ==
Because the two reacting groups are already attached, two basic modes of addition are possible in this reaction. Depending on whether the tether that links to the dienophile is attached to the end or the middle of the diene, fused or bridged polycyclic ring systems can be formed.

The tether than attaches the two reacting groups also affects the geometry of the reaction. As a result of its conformational and other structural restrictions, the exo vs endo results are usually not based on the simple (intermolecular) Diels–Alder reaction effects.

== Use in total synthesis ==
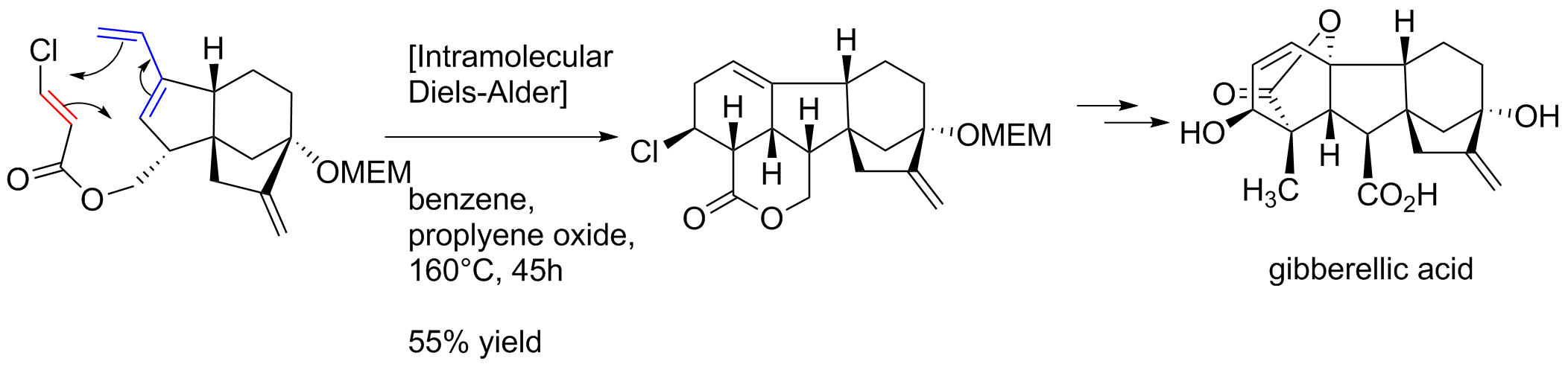
An intramolecular Diels-Alder reaction was one of the steps in a total synthesis of gibberellic acid. Colour-coding: diene is blue, dienophile is red

Intramolecular Diels-Alder cycloaddition has been used in total synthesis. Through this reaction polycyclic compounds can be accessed with high stereoselectivity. The following potential drugs have been synthesized using the intramolecular Diels-Alder reaction: salvinorin A, himbacine, and solanapyrone A.
