= Acetyl nitrate =

Chemical compound

Names
- Preferred IUPAC name Acetic nitric anhydride
- Other names Acetyl nitrate

Identifiers
CAS Number	591-09-3
3D model (JSmol)	Interactive image
ChemSpider	11069
PubChem CID	11557
UNII	79CY6496CR
CompTox Dashboard (EPA)	DTXSID40207839
- InChI: InChI=1S/C2H3NO4/c1-2(4)7-3(5)6/h1H3 Key: JCZMXVGQBBATMY-UHFFFAOYSA-N
- SMILES: CC(=O)O[N+](=O)[O-]

Properties
Chemical formula	C_{2}H_{3}NO_{4}
Molar mass	105.049 g·mol^{−1}
Appearance	colorless liquid
Density	1.24 g/cm^{3} (15 °C)
Boiling point	22 °C at 70 Torr

Hazards
- Occupational safety and health (OHS/OSH)
Main hazards	explosion
- Except where otherwise noted, data are given for materials in their standard state (at 25 °C [77 °F], 100 kPa). Infobox references

Acetyl nitrate is the organic compound with the formula CH_{3}C(O)ONO_{2}. It is classified as the mixed anhydride of nitric and acetic acids. It is a colorless explosive liquid that fumes in moist air.

== Synthesis and reactions ==
It was first prepared in 1907 by Amé Pictet and E. Khotynsky from acetic anhydride and dinitrogen pentoxide, fuming nitric acid can also be used:

(CH_{3}CO)_{2}O + HNO_{3} → CH_{3}C(O)ONO_{2} + CH_{3}COOH

It hydrolyzes in moist air to acetic acid and nitric acid. Alternatively, nitric acid adds to ketene.

For aromatic nitrations, acetyl nitrate is generated in situ by mixing nitric acid with an excess of acetic anhydride in the presence of the aromatic substrate.

It acetylates amines, akin to the behavior of acetyl chloride:

2NH_{3} + CH_{3}C(O)ONO_{2} → NH_{4}NO_{3} + CH_{3}CONH_{2}
