= Richard Wolffenstein (chemist) =

German chemist (1864–1926)

- Born: 21 August 1864; Berlin, Prussia
- Died: 5 May 1926 (aged 61); Berlin, Germany
- Known for: discovery of acetone peroxide structure of nicotine Wolffenstein-Böters reaction
- Scientific career
- Workplaces: Technische Universität Berlin

Richard Wolffenstein (21 August 1864 – 5 June 1926) was a German chemist.

He discovered acetone peroxide in 1895 by reacting acetone with hydrogen peroxide.

The Wolffenstein-Böters reaction, which he discovered in 1913, was an alternative production method for explosives.

== Biography ==
Wolffenstein studied at Leipzig University, Heidelberg University, the Ludwig-Maximilians-Universität München, and the Friedrich Wilhelm University of Berlin. He was awarded his doctor title in 1888, and became an assistant at the Veterinary Technische Hochschule Berlin, and later at the University of Breslau under Albert Ladenburg. In 1893, he returned to the Technische Hochschule Berlin, now called Technische Universität Berlin, where he obtained his habilitation in 1895 and became professor of chemistry in 1921.
