= Zincke–Suhl reaction =

Reaction in organic chemistry

The Zincke–Suhl reaction is a special case of a Friedel-Crafts alkylation and was first described by Theodor Zincke and Suhl in 1906. Unlike the traditional Friedel-Crafts reaction, the reduction of the phenyl ring leads to a higher energy final product that can be used as starting material in the dienol–benzene rearrangement, among other reactions.

Zincke–Suhl reaction

The classic example of this reaction is the conversion of p-cresol to a cyclohexadienone (with the aid of aluminium chloride as a catalyst and tetrachloromethane as a solvent). Melvin Newman, a scientist from the U.S. intensively studied the reaction in the 1950s and reported several improved procedures as well as mechanistic studies. Since then, studies investigating the impact of alternate reagents have been conducted by others.

== Mechanism ==

Aluminum chloride plays a range of functions in this reaction, first reacting with p-cresol to form phenoxy aluminum chloride along with a molecule of hydrogen chloride. Additionally, aluminum chloride activates a molecule of tetrachloride that in turn is subjected to a nucleophilic attack by the phenoxy aluminum chloride. Subsequently, the product interacts with aluminum chloride and tetrachloride again to form a loose complex. Finally, the product is treated with water, resulting in the final product.

== Catalysts ==
During a series of tests, Newman found that utilization of carbon disulfide as a solvent was demonstrated to improve the yield. As an example, addition of a solution of p-cresol and carbon disulfide to a suspension of aluminum chloride and carbon disulfide resulted in a 20% improvement in yield.

Yields Obtained from the Zincke-Suhl Reaction Under Different Conditions
P-cresol (mol)	CCl_{4} (mol)	AlCl_{3} (mol)	Solvent	Temperature (C)	Time	Yield
0.2	0.4	0.26	CCl_{4}	Reflux	120	40.0
0.05	0.05	0.063	CS_{2}	5	120	56.0
0.05	0.05	0.063	CS_{2}	45	120	60.3

== Applications ==
Zincke-Suhl products can be used as starting reagents for the dienol benzene rearrangement. This is an important reaction for artificially producing biologically relevant molecules including the A ring of steroids.

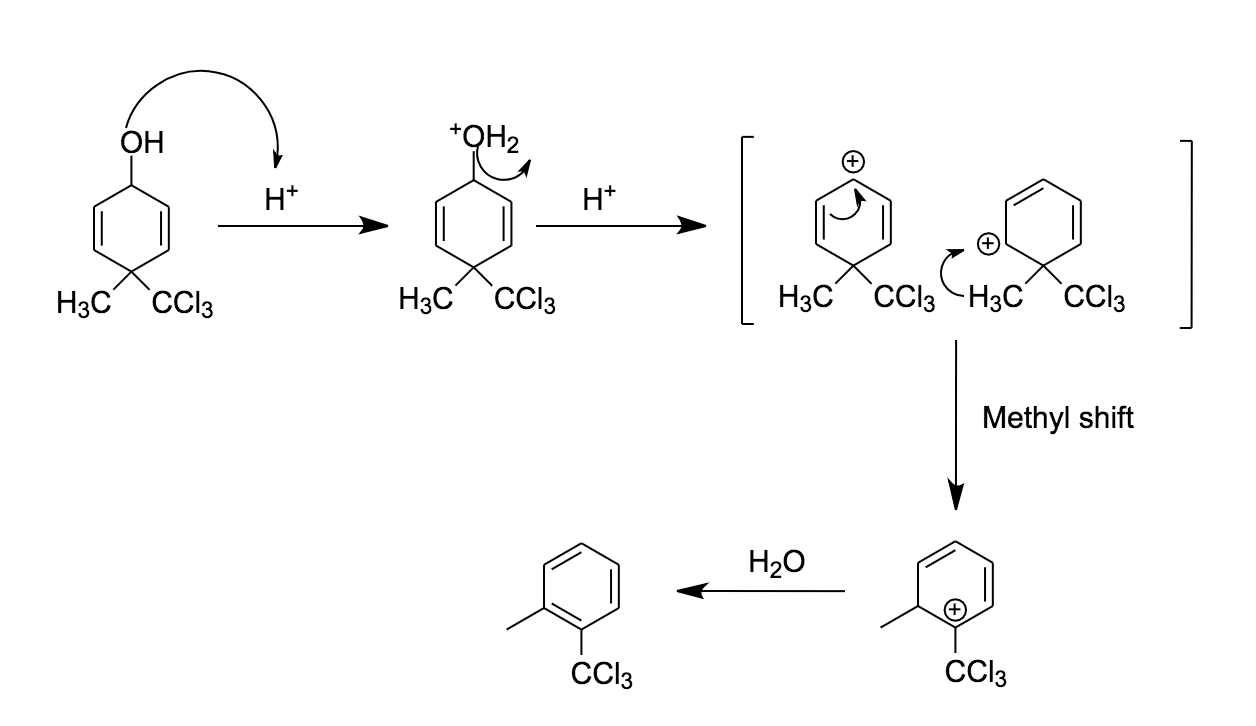

Perhaps the most intriguing application of the Zincke–Suhl reaction is its potential following von Auwers rearrangements. Demeunier and Jaeckh described how such rearrangements may result in the formation of high energy intermediates. For example, reformation of the aromatic ring from the semibenzene (cyclohexadienone) follows an energy drop of just under 36 kcal/mol. Such staunch drops have been experimentally shown to lead to efficient aromatization with high yields.

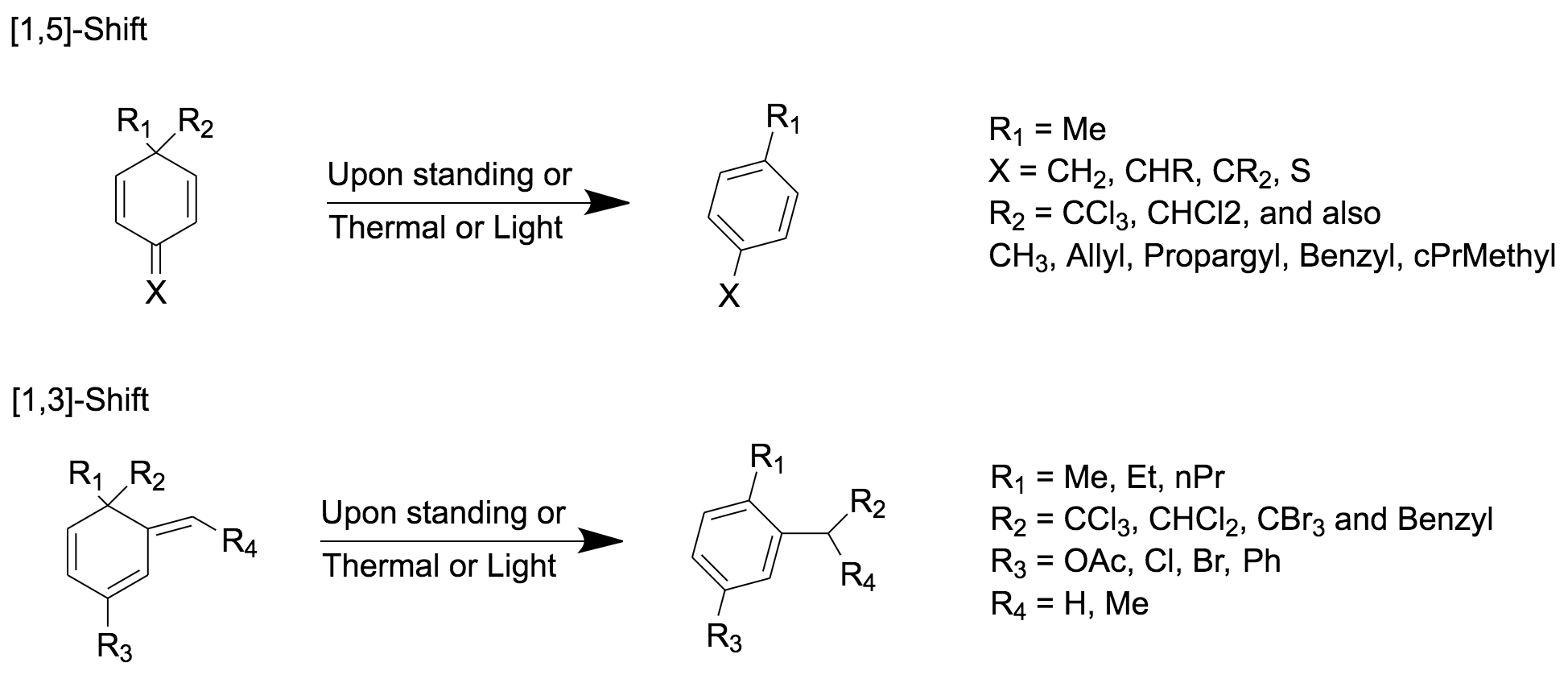

Other products including dioxocins and polymers can form depending upon the location of the initial addition of carbon tetrachloride. Furthermore, changes to the reagents such as the use of chloroform instead of carbon tetrachloride can form additional products.

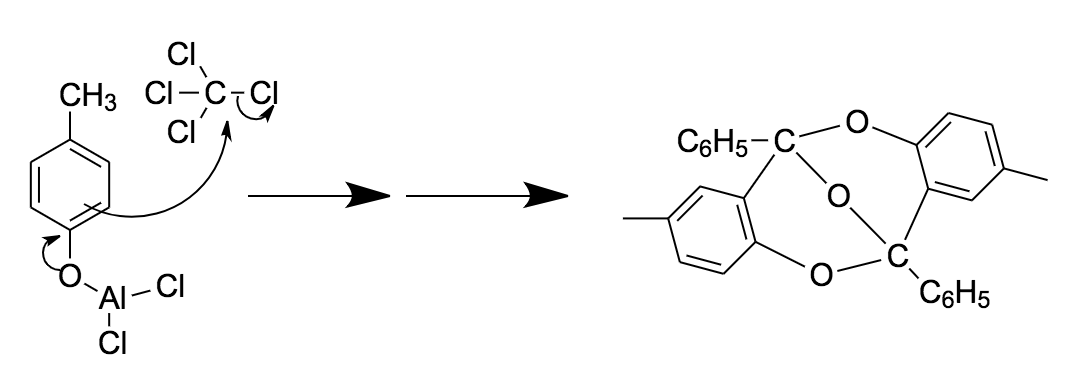

Above: Ortho-addition of tetrachloride to phenoxy aluminum chloride can produce 6,12-diphenyl-2,8-dimethyl-6,12-epoxy-6H, 12H-dibenzo[b,f][1,5] dioxocin, a high-melting, white polymer.
