= Silver hexafluorophosphate =

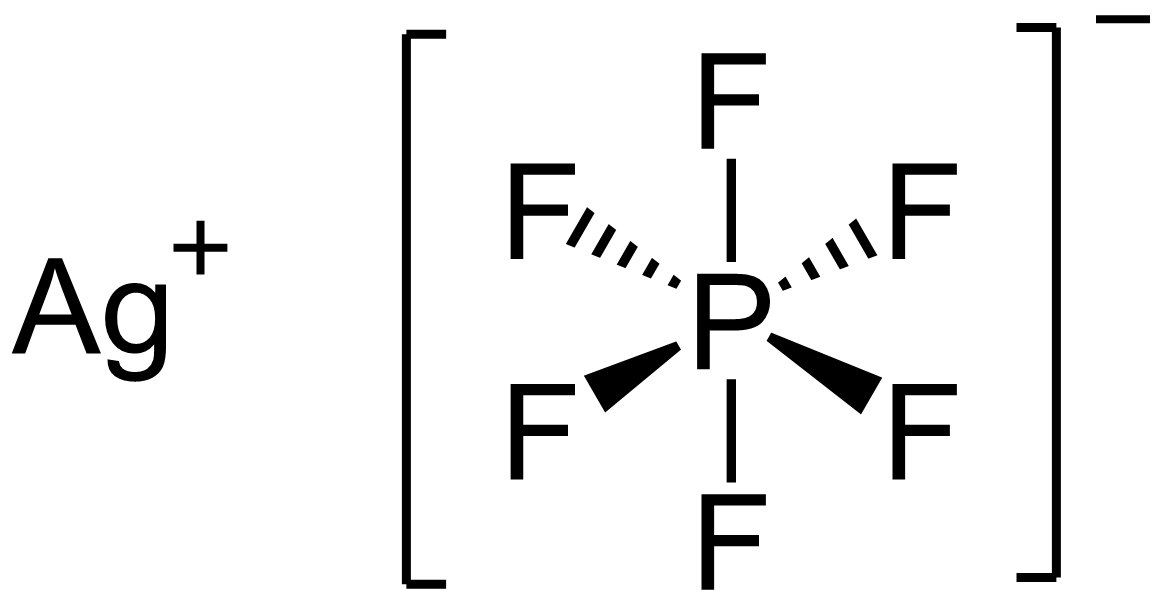

Identifiers
CAS Number	26042-63-7
3D model (JSmol)	Interactive image
ChemSpider	147361
ECHA InfoCard	100.043.101
EC Number	247-428-6
PubChem CID	168464
CompTox Dashboard (EPA)	DTXSID70885326
- InChI: InChI=1S/Ag.F6P/c;1-7(2,3,4,5)6/q+1;-1 Key: SCQBROMTFBBDHF-UHFFFAOYSA-N; InChI=1/Ag.F6P/c;1-7(2,3,4,5)6/q+1;-1 Key: SCQBROMTFBBDHF-UHFFFAOYAC
- SMILES: [Ag+].F[P-](F)(F)(F)(F)F

Properties
Chemical formula	AgPF_{6}
Molar mass	252.83 g/mol
Appearance	Off-white powder
Melting point	102 °C (216 °F; 375 K)
Solubility	soluble in organic solvents

Hazards
- GHS labelling
Pictograms	(GHS05: Corrosive)
Signal word	Danger
Hazard statements	H314
Precautionary statements	P260, P264, P280, P301+P330+P331, P303+P361+P353, P304+P340, P305+P351+P338, P310, P321, P363, P405, P501
NFPA 704 (fire diamond)	3 0 0
Safety data sheet (SDS)	External MSDS
- Except where otherwise noted, data are given for materials in their standard state (at 25 °C [77 °F], 100 kPa). verify (what is ?) Infobox references

Silver hexafluorophosphate, sometimes referred to "silver PF-6," is an inorganic compound with the chemical formula AgPF_{6}.

== Uses and reactions ==
Silver hexafluorophosphate is a commonly encountered reagent in inorganic and organometallic chemistry. It is commonly used to replace halide ligands with the weakly coordinating hexafluorophosphate anion; abstraction of the halide is driven by the precipitation of the appropriate silver halide. Illustrative is the preparation of acetonitrile complexes from a metal bromide, a reaction that would typically be conducted in a solution of acetonitrile:

AgPF_{6} + Re(CO)_{5}Br + CH_{3}CN → AgBr + [Re(CO)_{5}(CH_{3}CN)]PF_{6}

Ligands with tightly-bound halide atoms such as xenon difluoride coordinate the silver, but do not themselves decompose:

AgPF_{6} + 2 XeF_{2} → [Ag(XeF_{2})_{2}]PF_{6}.

AgPF_{6} can act as an oxidant, forming silver metal as a by-product. For example, in solution in dichloromethane, ferrocene is oxidised to ferrocenium hexafluorophosphate:

AgPF_{6} + Fe(C_{5}H_{5})_{2} → Ag + [Fe(C_{5}H_{5})_{2}]PF_{6} (E = 0.65 V)

== Related reagents ==
In terms of their properties and applications, silver tetrafluoroborate (AgBF_{4}) and the hexafluoroantimonate (AgSbF_{6}) are similar to AgPF_{6}.

=== Comparison with silver nitrate ===
Silver nitrate is a traditional and less expensive halide abstraction reagent, as indicated by its widespread use in qualitative tests for halides.

Relative to AgPF_{6}, however, silver nitrate is poorly soluble in weakly basic solvents: the nitrate anion is Lewis basic and presents an interfering ligand that precludes its use in stringent applications.
