= Silver tetrafluoroborate =

Names
- IUPAC name Silver tetrafluoridoborate(1–)
- Other names: Borate(1-), tetrafluoro-, silver(1+); Silver fluoroborate

Identifiers
CAS Number	14104-20-2
3D model (JSmol)	Interactive image
ChemSpider	140438
ECHA InfoCard	100.034.491
EC Number	237-956-5
PubChem CID	159722
RTECS number	ED2875000
UN number	3260
CompTox Dashboard (EPA)	DTXSID40884548
- InChI: InChI=1S/Ag.BF4/c;2-1(3,4)5/q+1;-1 Key: CCAVYRRHZLAMDJ-UHFFFAOYSA-N; InChI=1/Ag.BF4/c;2-1(3,4)5/q+1;-1 Key: CCAVYRRHZLAMDJ-UHFFFAOYAH
- SMILES: [Ag+].F[B-](F)(F)F

Properties
Chemical formula	AgBF_{4}
Molar mass	194.67 g·mol^{−1}
Appearance	Beige powder
Density	4.61 g/cm^{3}
Melting point	71.5 °C (160.7 °F; 344.6 K) (monohydrate)
Solubility in water	soluble
Band gap	3.16 eV

Structure
Crystal structure	Orthorhombic
Space group	Pnma
Point group	mmm
Lattice constant	a = 8.089±0.008 Å, b = 5.312±0.006 Å, c = 6.752±0.009 Å α = 90°, β = 90°, γ = 90°
Lattice volume (V)	290.1 Å^{3}
Formula units (Z)	4

Hazards
- GHS labelling
Pictograms	(GHS05: Corrosive)
Signal word	Danger
Hazard statements	H314
Precautionary statements	P260, P264, P280, P301+P330+P331, P303+P361+P353, P304+P340+P310, P305+P351+P338+P310, P363, P405, P501
NFPA 704 (fire diamond)	3 0 1
Threshold limit value (TLV)	2.5 mg/m^{3} (TWA)
- NIOSH (US health exposure limits)
PEL (Permissible)	2.5 mg/m^{3} (TWA)
REL (Recommended)	2.5 mg/m^{3} (TWA)
IDLH (Immediate danger)	250 mg/m^{3}
- Except where otherwise noted, data are given for materials in their standard state (at 25 °C [77 °F], 100 kPa). verify (what is ?) Infobox references

Silver tetrafluoroborate is an inorganic compound with the molecular formula AgBF_{4}. It is a white solid (although commercial samples often are gray) that dissolves in polar organic solvents as well as water.

== Structure ==
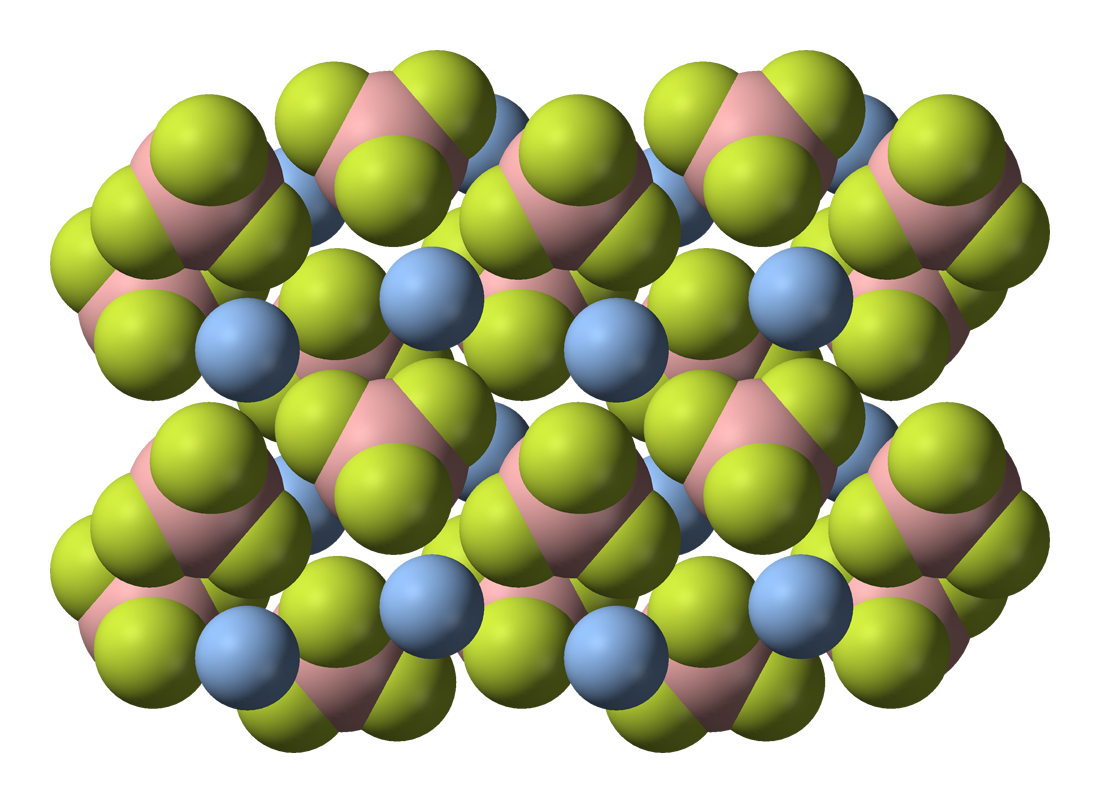
Packing of AgBF_{4}. Color code: green = F, orange = B, blue = Ag

According to X-ray crystallography, the solid compound consists of Ag^{+} centers bound to four fluoride sites of the BF_{4}^{−}.

== Preparation ==
Silver tetrafluoroborate can be prepared by several methods. A simple route entails dissolving silver carbonate (Ag_{2}CO_{3}) in aqueous tetrafluoroboric acid (HBF_{4}). It can also be produced by treating silver(I) fluoride (AgF) with boron trifluoride in nitromethane (CH_{3}NO_{2}) solution. The reaction between boron trifluoride (BF_{3}) and a benzene suspension of silver oxide (Ag_{2}O) is yet another route, one that exploits the solubility of the compound in benzene. This method however affords silver fulminate (AgCNO), a sensitive explosive.

== Laboratory uses ==
In the inorganic and organometallic chemistry laboratory, silver tetrafluoroborate, sometimes referred to "silver BF-4", is a used as a reagent to remove halide ligands and to oxidize electron-rich complexes. In dichloromethane, silver tetrafluoroborate is a moderately strong oxidant. Similar to silver hexafluorophosphate (AgPF_{6}), it is commonly used to replace halide anions or ligands with the weakly coordinating tetrafluoroborate anions. The abstraction of the halide is driven by the precipitation of the corresponding silver halide.
