= Gold(III) oxide =

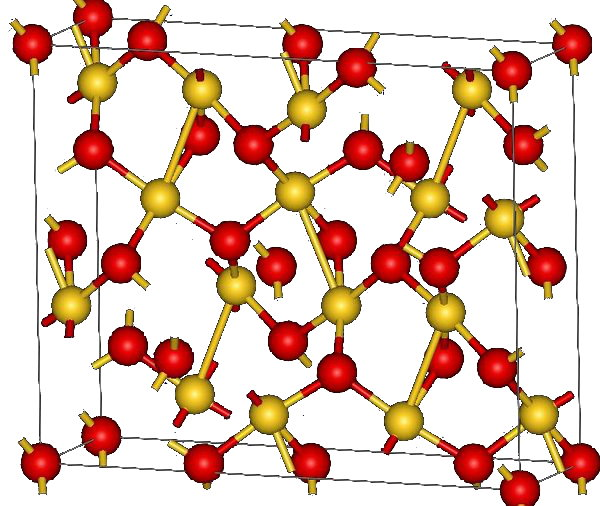

Names
- IUPAC name Gold(III) oxide
- Other names Gold trioxide, Gold sesquioxide, Auric oxide

Identifiers
| CAS Number | 1303-58-8 |
| 3D model (JSmol) | Interactive image |
| ChemSpider | 144478 |
| ECHA InfoCard | 100.013.748 |
| EC Number | 215-122-1 |
| PubChem CID | 164805 |
| UNII | LW5Y686RUP |
| CompTox Dashboard (EPA) | DTXSID20926672 |
- InChI: InChI=1S/2Au.3O/q2*+3;3*-2 Key: DDYSHSNGZNCTKB-UHFFFAOYSA-N
- SMILES: [O-2].[O-2].[O-2].[Au+3].[Au+3]

Properties
| Chemical formula | Au_{2}O_{3} |
| Molar mass | 441.93 |
| Appearance | red-brown solid |
| Density | 11.34 g/cm^{3} at 20 °C |
| Melting point | 298 °C (568 °F; 571 K) |
| Solubility in water | insoluble in water, soluble in hydrochloric and nitric acid |

Structure
| Crystal structure | Orthorhombic, oF40 |
| Space group | = Fdd2, No. 43 |

Hazards
- GHS labelling
| Pictograms | (GHS07: Exclamation mark) |
| Signal word | Warning |
| Hazard statements | H315, H319 |
| Precautionary statements | P264, P264+P265, P280, P302+P352, P305+P351+P338, P321, P332+P317, P337+P317, P362+P364 |
| NFPA 704 (fire diamond) | 1 0 0 |
- Except where otherwise noted, data are given for materials in their standard state (at 25 °C [77 °F], 100 kPa). verify (what is ?) Infobox references

Gold(III) oxide (Au_{2}O_{3}) is an inorganic compound of gold and oxygen with the formula Au_{2}O_{3}. It is a red-brown solid that decomposes at 298 °C (568 °F).

According to X-ray crystallography, Au_{2}O_{3} features square planar gold centers with both 2- and 3-coordinated oxides. The four Au-O bond distances range from 193 to 207 picometers.

The crystals can be prepared by heating amorphous hydrated gold(III) oxide with perchloric acid and an alkali metal perchlorate in a sealed quartz tube at a temperature of around 250 °C (482 °F) and a pressure of around 30 MPa.
