= Sodium ferrocyanide =

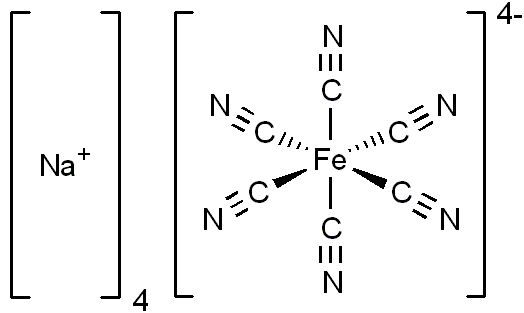

Names
- IUPAC name Sodium [hexacyanoferrate(II)]
- Other names: Yellow prussiate of soda (YPS); Tetrasodium hexacyanoferrate; Gelbnatron; Ferrocyannatrium; sodium hexacyanoferrate(II); Yellow blood salt

Identifiers
CAS Number	13601-19-9
3D model (JSmol)	Interactive image
ChEBI	CHEBI:30061
ECHA InfoCard	100.033.696
EC Number	237-081-9
E number	E535 (acidity regulators, ...)
PubChem CID	26129
UNII	5HT6X21AID
UN number	3077 (SODIUM FERROCYANIDE)
CompTox Dashboard (EPA)	DTXSID3051337
- InChI: Key: GTSHREYGKSITGK-UHFFFAOYSA-N; InChI=1S/6CN.Fe.4Na/c6*1-2;;;;;/q6*-1;+2;4*+1
- SMILES: [Na+].[Na+].N#C[Fe-4](C#N)(C#N)(C#N)(C#N)C#N.[Na+].[Na+]

Properties
Chemical formula	Na_{4}[Fe(CN)_{6}]
Molar mass	303.91 g/mol
Appearance	pale yellow crystals
Odor	odorless
Density	1.458 g/cm^{3}
Melting point	435 °C (815 °F; 708 K) (anhydrous); 81.5 °C (178.7 °F; 354.6 K) (decahydrate) (decomposes)
Solubility in water	10.2 g/100 mL (10 °C); 17.6 g/100 mL (20 °C); 39.7 g/100 mL (96.6 °C)
Refractive index (n_{D})	1.530

Structure
Crystal structure	monoclinic

Related compounds
Other anions	Sodium ferricyanide (Red prussiate of soda)
Other cations	Ammonium ferrocyanide; Potassium ferrocyanide; Prussian blue; Sodium nitroprusside
- Except where otherwise noted, data are given for materials in their standard state (at 25 °C [77 °F], 100 kPa). verify (what is ?) Infobox references

Sodium ferrocyanide is the sodium salt of the coordination compound of formula [Fe(CN)_{6}]^{4−}. In its hydrous form, Na_{4}Fe(CN)_{6}·10H_{2}O (sodium ferrocyanide decahydrate), it is sometimes known as yellow prussiate of soda. It is a yellow crystalline solid that is soluble in water and insoluble in alcohol. The yellow color is the color of ferrocyanide anion. Despite the presence of the cyanide ligands, sodium ferrocyanide has low toxicity (acceptable daily intake 0–0.025 mg/kg body weight). The ferrocyanides are less toxic than many salts of cyanide, because they tend not to release free cyanide. However, like all ferrocyanide salt solutions, addition of an acid or exposure to UV light can result in the production of hydrogen cyanide gas, which is extremely toxic.

== Uses ==
When combined with a Fe(III) salt, it converts to a deep blue pigment called Prussian blue, Fe^{3+}_{4}[Fe^{2+}(CN)_{6}]_{3}. It is used as a stabilizer for the coating on welding rods. In the petroleum industry, it is used for removal of mercaptans.

In the EU, ferrocyanides (E 535–538) were, as of 2018, solely authorized as additives in salt and salt substitutes, where they serve as anticaking agents. The kidneys are the organ susceptible to ferrocyanide toxicity, but according to the EFSA, ferrocyanides are of no safety concern at the levels at which they are used.

== Production ==
Sodium ferrocyanide is produced industrially from hydrogen cyanide, ferrous chloride, and calcium hydroxide, the combination of which affords Ca_{2}[Fe(CN)_{6}]·11H_{2}O. A solution of this salt is then treated with sodium salts to precipitate the mixed calcium-sodium salt CaNa_{2}[Fe(CN)_{6}]_{2}, which in turn is treated with sodium carbonate to give the tetrasodium salt.
