= Iron(II) cyanide =

Names
- IUPAC name Iron(II) cyanide

Identifiers
CAS Number	1948-47-6
3D model (JSmol)	Interactive image
ChEBI	CHEBI:31594
ChemSpider	391824
EC Number	237-875-5
KEGG	C12218
PubChem CID	6102315
- InChI: InChI=1S/2CN.Fe/c2*1-2;/q2*-1;+2 Key: OXNSNGFUWQVOKD-UHFFFAOYSA-N
- SMILES: [C-]#N.[C-]#N.[Fe+2]

Properties
Chemical formula	Fe(CN)_{2}
Molar mass	107.881

Related compounds
Other cations	cobalt(II) cyanide nickel(II) cyanide
Related compounds	potassium ferrocyanide
- Except where otherwise noted, data are given for materials in their standard state (at 25 °C [77 °F], 100 kPa). Infobox references

Iron(II) cyanide is a hypothetical inorganic compound with the empirical formula Fe(CN)_{2}. A chemical compound that has been produced from the decomposition of ammonium ferrocyanide has been claimed to be Fe(CN)_{2}, but no spectroscopic evidence has been presented.
