= Hofmann clathrates =

Coordination polymer

In inorganic chemistry, Hofmann clathrates refers to materials with the formula Ni(CN)_{2}(NH_{3})(C_{6}H_{6}). These materials are a type of coordination polymer that have properties of inclusion compounds. They have attracted attention because they can be used to separate xylenes. On a conceptual level, Hofmann clathrates can be viewed as forerunners to metal–organic frameworks (MOFs).

== Structures ==
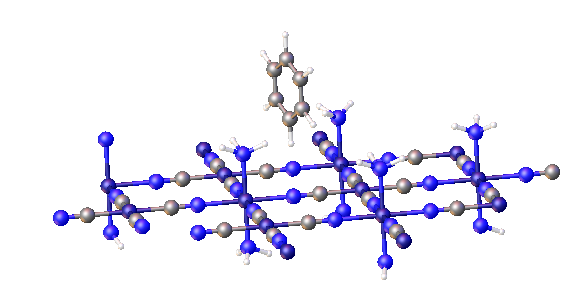
Structure of Ni(CN)_{2}(NH_{3})(C_{6}H_{6}). Some N-H bonds are omitted.

The empirical formula Ni(CN)_{2}(NH_{3})(C_{6}H_{6}) reflects the presence of two types of nickel(II) centers, one of which is the square-planar tetracyanonickelate, [Ni(CN)_{4}]^{2-}. The second kind of nickel site consists of [Ni(NH_{3})_{2}]^{2+} groups that are connected to the Ni-CN nitrogens. Thus cyanide serves as a bridging ligand. The linking of the [Ni(CN)_{4}]^{2-} and trans-[Ni(NH_{3})_{2}]^{2+} subunits results in a sheet-like polymer. Voids between these sheets, defined by the ammonia ligands, are occupied by benzene molecules.

== Variations ==
Many variations of Hofmann clathrates have been reported. The ammonia ligands can be replaced by diamines. Tetracyanonickelate can be replaced by tetracyanopalladate. A wide range of arenes can occupy the benzene site.

== See also ==
- Host–guest chemistry
- Clathrate compound
