= Potassium ferricyanide =

Chemical compound

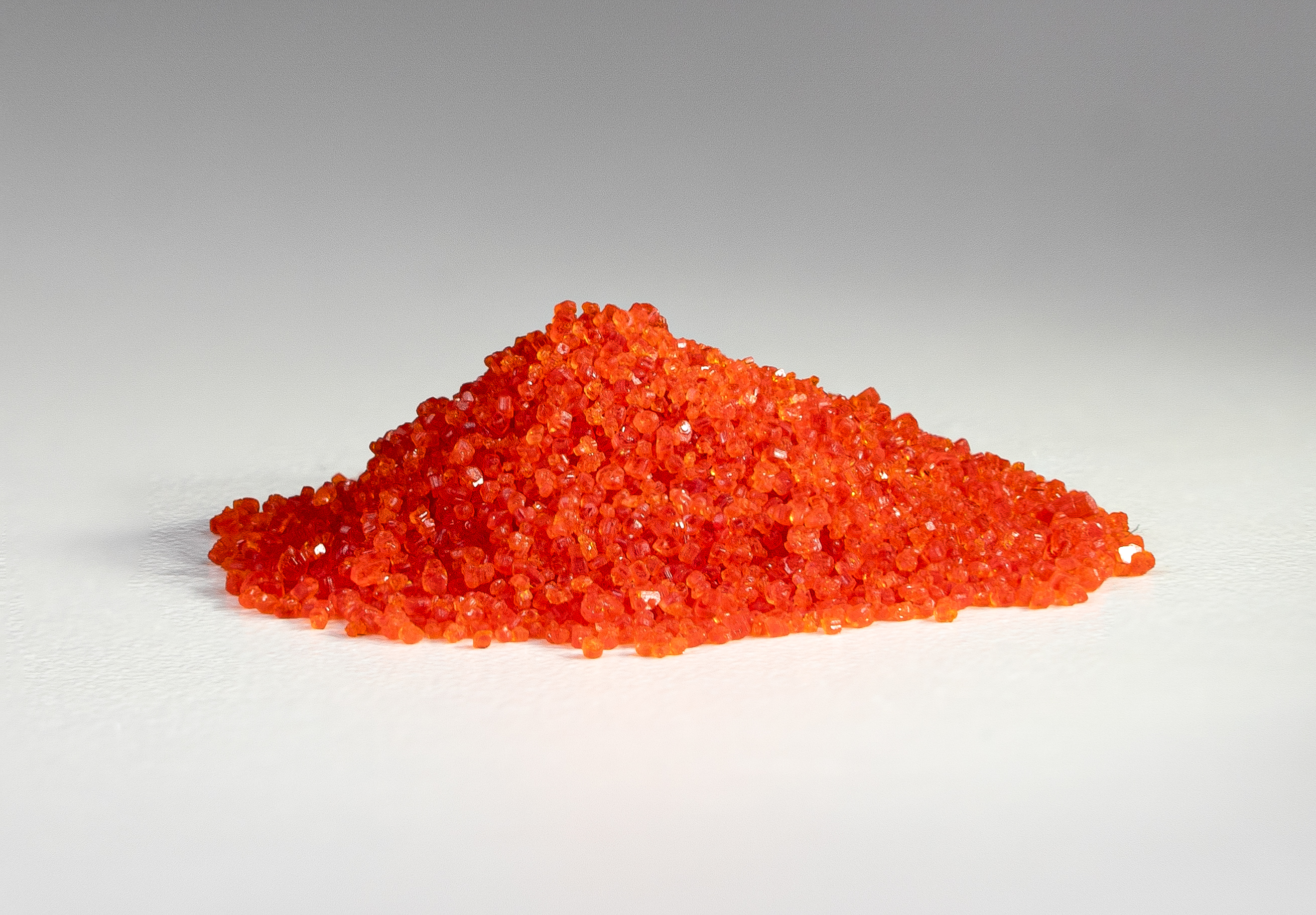

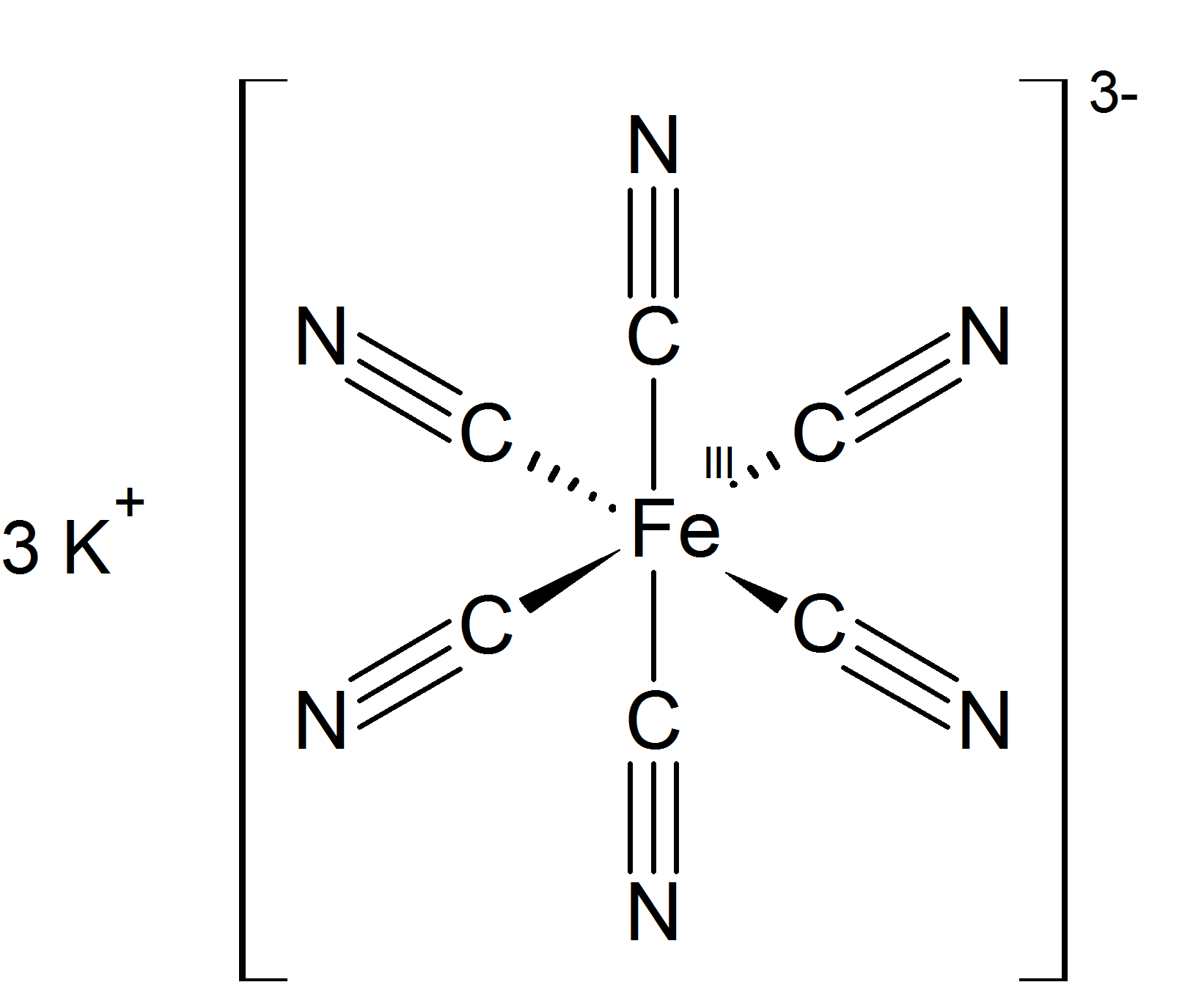

Names
- IUPAC name Potassium hexacyanoferrate(III)
- Other names Prussian red Potassium ferricyanide

Identifiers
CAS Number	13746-66-2
3D model (JSmol)	Interactive image
ChEBI	CHEBI:30060
ChemSpider	24458
ECHA InfoCard	100.033.916
EC Number	237-323-3
Gmelin Reference	21683
PubChem CID	26250
RTECS number	LJ8225000
UNII	U4MAF9C813
CompTox Dashboard (EPA)	DTXSID9031939
- InChI: InChI=1S/6CN.Fe.3K/c6*1-2;;;;/q6*-1;+3;3*+1 Key: BYGOPQKDHGXNCD-UHFFFAOYSA-N; InChI=1S/6CN.Fe.3K/c6*1-2;;;;/q6*-1;+3;3*+1 Key: BYGOPQKDHGXNCD-UHFFFAOYAG
- SMILES: [K+].[K+].N#C[Fe-3](C#N)(C#N)(C#N)(C#N)C#N.[K+]

Properties
Chemical formula	K_{3}[Fe(CN)_{6}]
Molar mass	329.24 g/mol
Appearance	deep red crystals, sometimes small pellets, orange to dark red powder
Density	1.89 g/cm^{3}, solid
Melting point	300 °C (572 °F; 573 K)
Boiling point	decomposes
Solubility in water	330 g/L ("cold water"); 464 g/L (20 °C); 775 g/L ("hot water")
Solubility	slightly soluble in alcohol soluble in acid soluble in water
Magnetic susceptibility (χ)	+2290.0·10^{−6} cm^{3}/mol

Structure
Crystal structure	monoclinic
Coordination geometry	octahedral at Fe

Hazards
- GHS labelling
Pictograms	(GHS07: Exclamation mark)
Signal word	Warning
Hazard statements	H302, H315, H319, H332, H335
Precautionary statements	P261, P264, P270, P271, P280, P301+P312, P302+P352, P304+P312, P304+P340, P305+P351+P338, P312, P321, P330, P332+P313, P337+P313, P362, P403+P233, P405, P501
NFPA 704 (fire diamond)	1 0 0
Flash point	Non-flammable
- Lethal dose or concentration (LD, LC)
LD_{50} (median dose)	2970 mg/kg (mouse, oral)
Safety data sheet (SDS)	MSDS

Related compounds
Other anions	Potassium ferrocyanide
Other cations	Prussian blue
- Except where otherwise noted, data are given for materials in their standard state (at 25 °C [77 °F], 100 kPa). verify (what is ?) Infobox references

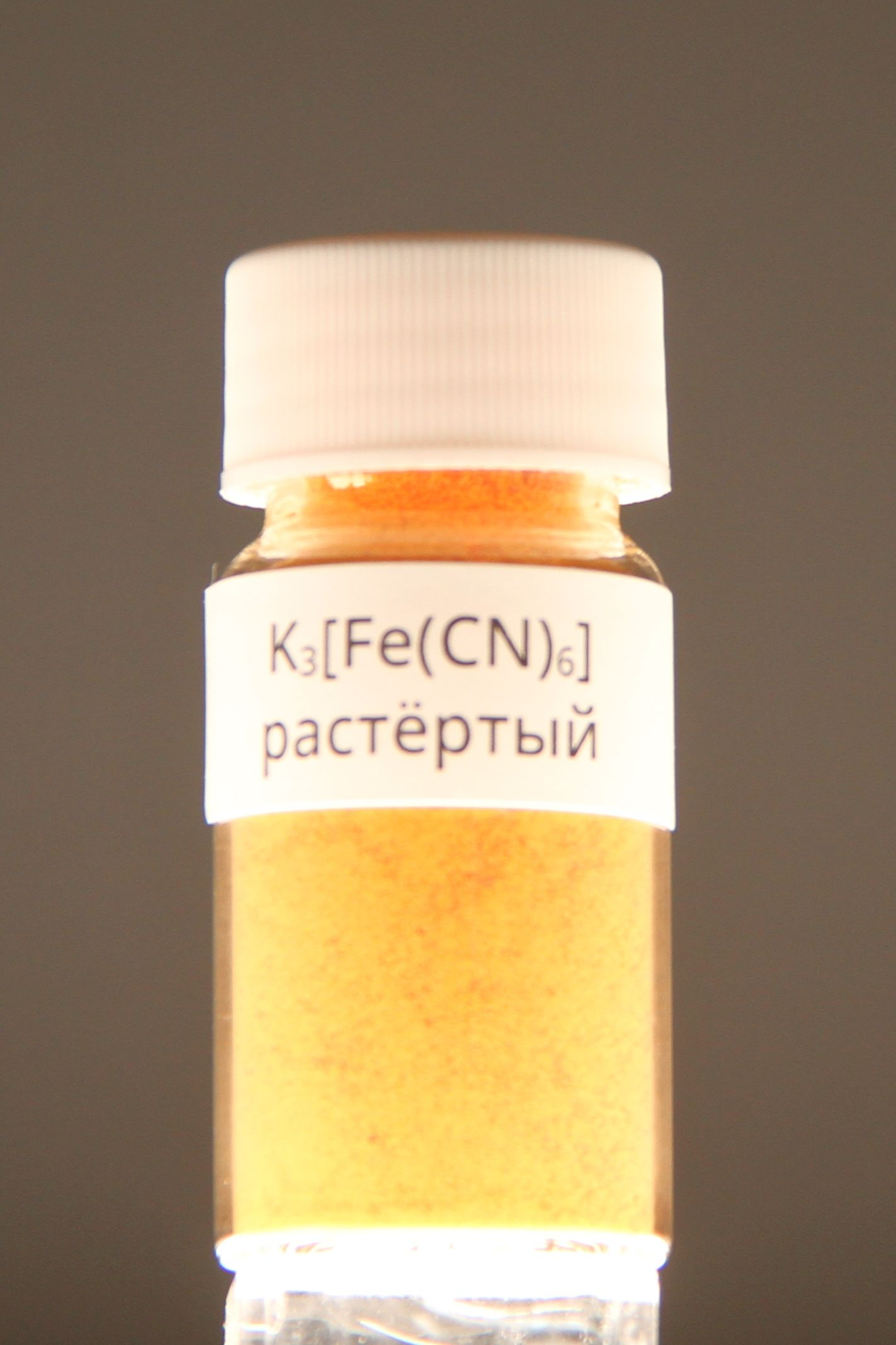
Potassium ferricyanide when milled has lighter color

Potassium ferricyanide is the chemical compound with the formula K_{3}[Fe(CN)_{6}]. This bright red salt contains the octahedrally coordinated [Fe(CN)_{6}]^{3−} ion. It is soluble in water and its solution shows some green-yellow fluorescence. It was discovered in 1822 by Leopold Gmelin.

== Preparation ==
Potassium ferricyanide is manufactured by passing chlorine through a solution of potassium ferrocyanide. Potassium ferricyanide separates from the solution:

2 K_{4}[Fe(CN)_{6}] + Cl_{2} → 2 K_{3}[Fe(CN)_{6}] + 2 KCl

== Structure ==
Like other metal cyanides, solid potassium ferricyanide has a complicated polymeric structure. The polymer consists of octahedral [Fe(CN)_{6}]^{3−} centers crosslinked with K^{+} ions that are bound to the CN ligands. The K^{+}---NCFe linkages break when the solid is dissolved in water.

== Applications ==
The compound is also used to harden iron and steel, in electroplating, dyeing wool, as a laboratory reagent, and as a mild oxidizing agent in organic chemistry.

=== Photography ===
==== Blueprint, cyanotype, toner ====
The compound has widespread use in blueprint drawing and in photography (Cyanotype process). Several photographic print toning processes involve the use of potassium ferricyanide. It is often used as a mild bleach in a concentration of 10g/L to reduce film or print density.

==== Bleaching ====
Potassium ferricyanide was used as an oxidizing agent to remove silver from color negatives and positives during processing, a process called bleaching. Because potassium ferricyanide bleaches are environmentally unfriendly, short-lived, and capable of releasing hydrogen cyanide gas if mixed with high concentrations and volumes of acid, bleaches using ferric EDTA have been used in color processing since the 1972 introduction of the Kodak C-41 process. In color lithography, potassium ferricyanide is used to reduce the size of color dots without reducing their number, as a kind of manual color correction called dot etching.

==== Farmer's reducer ====
Ferricyanide is also used in black-and-white photography with sodium thiosulfate (hypo) to minimize the density of a negative or gelatin silver print where the mixture is known as Farmer's reducer. This reagent can help offset problems from overexposure of the negative, or brighten the highlights in the print.

=== Reagent in organic synthesis ===
Potassium ferricyanide is used as an oxidant in organic chemistry. It is an oxidant for catalyst regeneration in Sharpless dihydroxylations.

=== Sensors and indicators ===
Potassium ferricyanide is also one of two compounds present in ferroxyl indicator solution (along with phenolphthalein) that turns blue (Prussian blue) in the presence of Fe^{2+} ions, and which can therefore be used to detect metal oxidation that will lead to rust. It is possible to calculate the number of moles of Fe^{2+} ions by using a colorimeter, because of the very intense color of Prussian blue.

In physiology experiments potassium ferricyanide provides a means increasing a solution's redox potential (E°' ~ 436 mV at pH 7). As such, it can oxidize reduced cytochrome c (E°' ~ 247 mV at pH 7) in isolated mitochondria. Sodium dithionite is usually used as a reducing chemical in such experiments (E°' ~ −420 mV at pH 7).

Potassium ferricyanide is used to determine the ferric reducing power potential of a sample (extract, chemical compound, etc.). Such a measurement is used to determine of the antioxidant property of a sample.

Potassium ferricyanide is a component of amperometric biosensors as an electron transfer agent replacing an enzyme's natural electron transfer agent such as oxygen as with the enzyme glucose oxidase. It is an ingredient in commercially available blood glucose meters for use by diabetics.

=== Other ===
Potassium ferricyanide is combined with potassium hydroxide (or sodium hydroxide as a substitute) and water to formulate Murakami's etchant. This etchant is used by metallographers to provide contrast between binder and carbide phases in cemented carbides.

== Prussian blue ==
Prussian blue, the deep blue pigment in blue printing, is generated by the reaction of K_{3}[Fe(CN)_{6}] with ferrous (Fe^{2+}) ions as well as K_{4}[Fe(CN)_{6}] with ferric salts.

In histology, potassium ferricyanide is used to detect ferrous iron in biological tissue. Potassium ferricyanide reacts with ferrous iron in acidic solution to produce the insoluble blue pigment, commonly referred to as Turnbull's blue or Prussian blue. To detect ferric (Fe^{3+}) iron, potassium ferrocyanide is used instead in the Perls' Prussian blue staining method. The material formed in the Turnbull's blue reaction and the compound formed in the Prussian blue reaction are the same.

== Safety ==
Potassium ferricyanide has low toxicity, its main hazard being that it is a mild irritant to the eyes and skin. However, under very strongly acidic conditions, highly toxic hydrogen cyanide gas is evolved, according to the equation:

6 H^{+} + [Fe(CN)_{6}]^{3−} → 6 HCN + Fe^{3+}

For example, it will react with diluted sulfuric acid under heating forming potassium sulfate, ferric sulfate and hydrogen cyanide.

2 K_{3} [Fe(CN)_{6}] + 6 H_{2}SO_{4} → 3 K_{2}SO_{4} + Fe_{2}(SO_{4})_{3} + 12 HCN

This will not occur with concentrated sulfuric acid as hydrolysis to formic acid and dehydration to carbon monoxide will take place instead.

2 K_{3} Fe(CN)_{6} + 12 H_{2}SO_{4} + 12 H_{2}O → 3 K_{2}SO_{4} + 6 (NH_{4})_{2} SO_{4} + Fe_{2}(SO_{4})_{3} + 12 CO

== See also ==
- Ferricyanide
- Ferrocyanide
- Potassium ferrocyanide
