= Nickel(II) cyanide =

Chemical compound

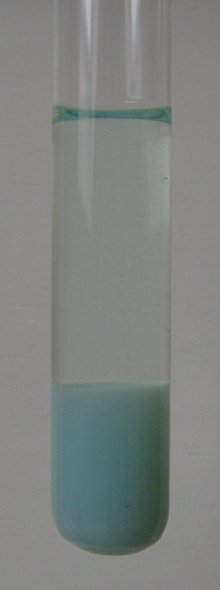

Identifiers
CAS Number	557-19-7; tetrahydrate: 13477-95-7
3D model (JSmol)	Interactive image; tetrahydrate: Interactive image
ChemSpider	10711
ECHA InfoCard	100.008.329
EC Number	209-160-8
PubChem CID	11184; tetrahydrate: 71317429
UNII	YX45CR8P6A
UN number	1653
CompTox Dashboard (EPA)	DTXSID60971065
- InChI: InChI=1S/2CN.Ni/c2*1-2;/q2*-1;+2 Key: NLEUXPOVZGDKJI-UHFFFAOYSA-N
- SMILES: [C-]#N.[C-]#N.[Ni+2]; tetrahydrate: [C-]#N.[C-]#N.O.O.O.O.[Ni+2]

Properties
Chemical formula	Ni(CN)_{2}
Molar mass	110.729 g/mol
Appearance	yellow-brown solid (anhydrous) blue gray solid (tetrahydrate)
Solubility in water	insoluble

Hazards
- GHS labelling
Pictograms	(GHS07: Exclamation mark) (GHS08: Health hazard) (GHS09: Environmental hazard)
Signal word	Danger
Hazard statements	H317, H334, H350, H372, H410
Precautionary statements	P201, P202, P260, P264, P270, P272, P273, P280, P281, P285, P302+P352, P304+P341, P308+P313, P314, P321, P333+P313, P342+P311, P363, P391, P405, P501

Related compounds
Other cations	Iron(II) cyanide Cobalt(II) cyanide
Related compounds	Potassium cyanonickelate
- Except where otherwise noted, data are given for materials in their standard state (at 25 °C [77 °F], 100 kPa). Infobox references

Nickel(II) cyanide is the inorganic compound with a chemical formula Ni(CN)_{2}. The trihydrate is a gray-green solid that is insoluble in most solvents including water, while the anhydrous form is a yellow solid.

== Production ==
Addition of two equivalents of sodium or potassium cyanide to a solution of nickel(II) ions in aqueous solution leads to the precipitation of nickel(II) cyanide trihydrate. On heating the trihydrate to 140 °C, this hydrate converts to anhydrous nickel(II) cyanide.

== Chemical properties ==
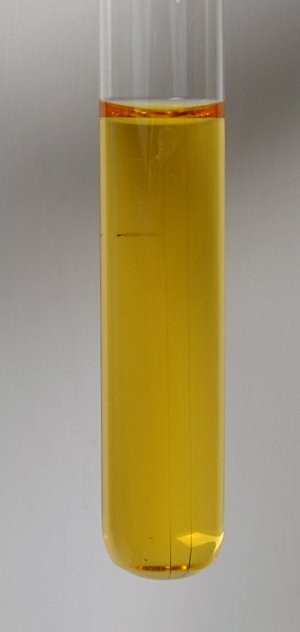
K_{2}[Ni(CN)_{4}] (tetracyanonickelate) solution)

Nickel(II) cyanide dissolves in potassium cyanide solution to produce a yellowish solution containing potassium tetracyanonickelate:

Ni(CN)_{2} + 2 KCN → K_{2}[Ni(CN)_{4}]

Nickel(II) cyanide will react with dimethylglyoxime (dmgH_{2}) and produce hydrogen cyanide:

Ni(CN)_{2} + 2 dmgH_{2} → Ni(dmgH)_{2} + 2 HCN

== See also ==
- Palladium dicyanide
