= Potassium tetracyanonickelate =

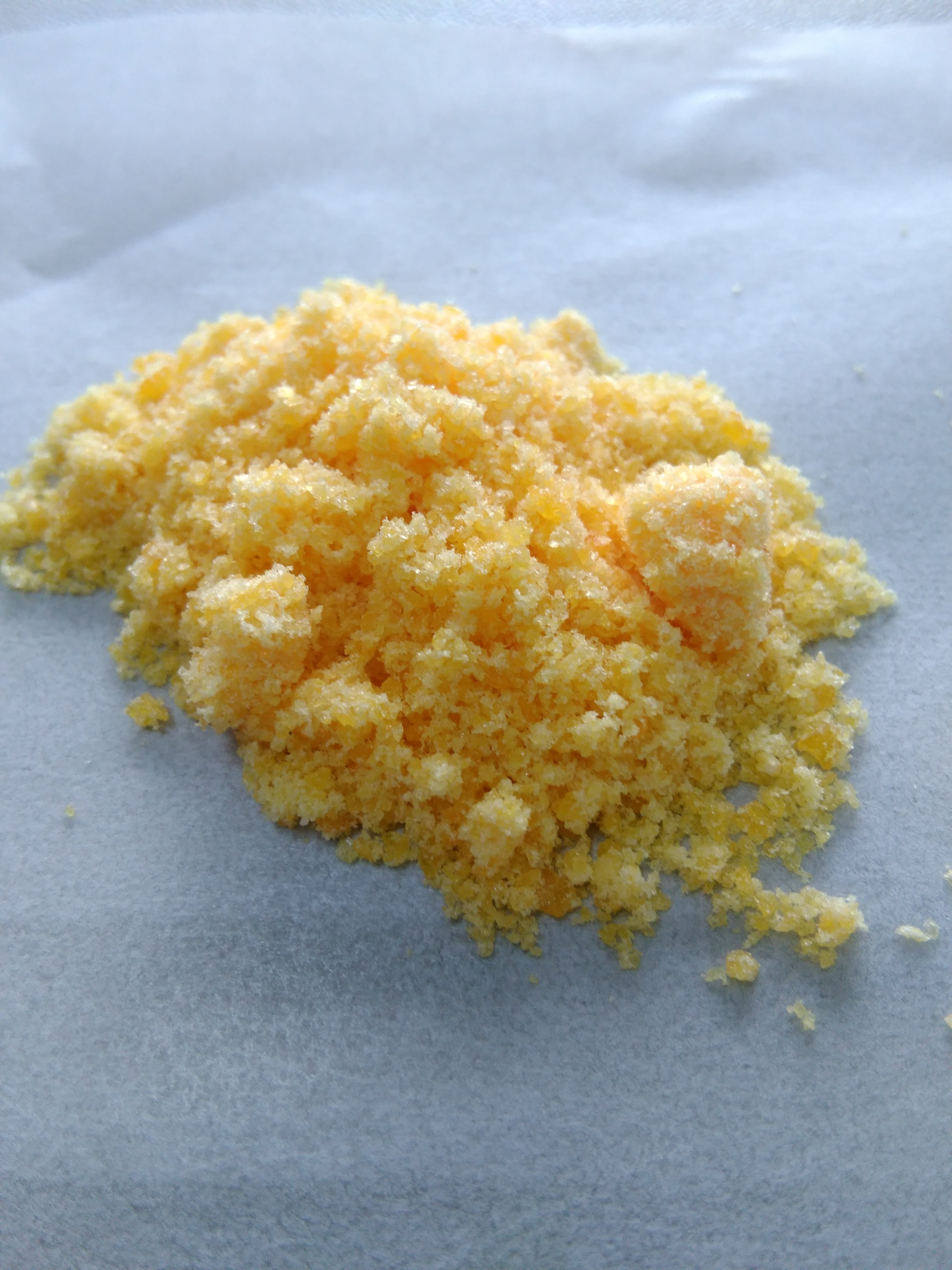

Names
- Other names Potassium tetracyanonickelate(II); dipotassium tetracyanonickelate

Identifiers
CAS Number	14220-17-8
3D model (JSmol)	Interactive image
ChEBI	CHEBI:30071
ChemSpider	11665648
ECHA InfoCard	100.034.605
EC Number	238-082-7
PubChem CID	61717
UNII	BCX7A142U2
CompTox Dashboard (EPA)	DTXSID40931384
- InChI: InChI=1S/4CN.2K.Ni/c4*1-2;;;/q4*-1;2*+1;+2 Key: LXWJYIBQIPSFSE-UHFFFAOYSA-N
- SMILES: [K+].[K+].[N-]#C[Ni+2](C#[N-])(C#[N-])C#[N-]

Properties
Chemical formula	K_{2}Ni(CN)_{4}
Appearance	yellow solid

Hazards
- GHS labelling
Pictograms	(GHS06: Toxic) (GHS09: Environmental hazard)
Signal word	Danger
Hazard statements	H300, H310, H330, H410
Precautionary statements	P260, P262, P264, P270, P271, P273, P280, P284, P301+P310, P302+P350, P304+P340, P310, P320, P321, P330, P361, P363, P391, P403+P233, P405, P501
- Except where otherwise noted, data are given for materials in their standard state (at 25 °C [77 °F], 100 kPa). Infobox references

Potassium tetracyanonickelate (IUPAC: Potassium tetracyanido nickelate(II)) is the inorganic compound with the formula K_{2}Ni(CN)_{4}. It is usually encountered as the monohydrate but the anhydrous salt is also known. Both are yellow, water-soluble, diamagnetic solids. The salt consists of potassium ions and the tetracyanonickelate coordination complex, which is square planar. The [Ni(CN)_{4}]^{2-} anions are arranged in a columnar structure with Ni---Ni distances of 4.294 Å, which is well beyond the sum of the van der Waals radius of the nickel cation. This columnar structure resembles those of the other [M(CN)_{4}]^{2-} anions of the heavy congeners of the group 10 metals (M = Pd, Pt).

== Preparation ==
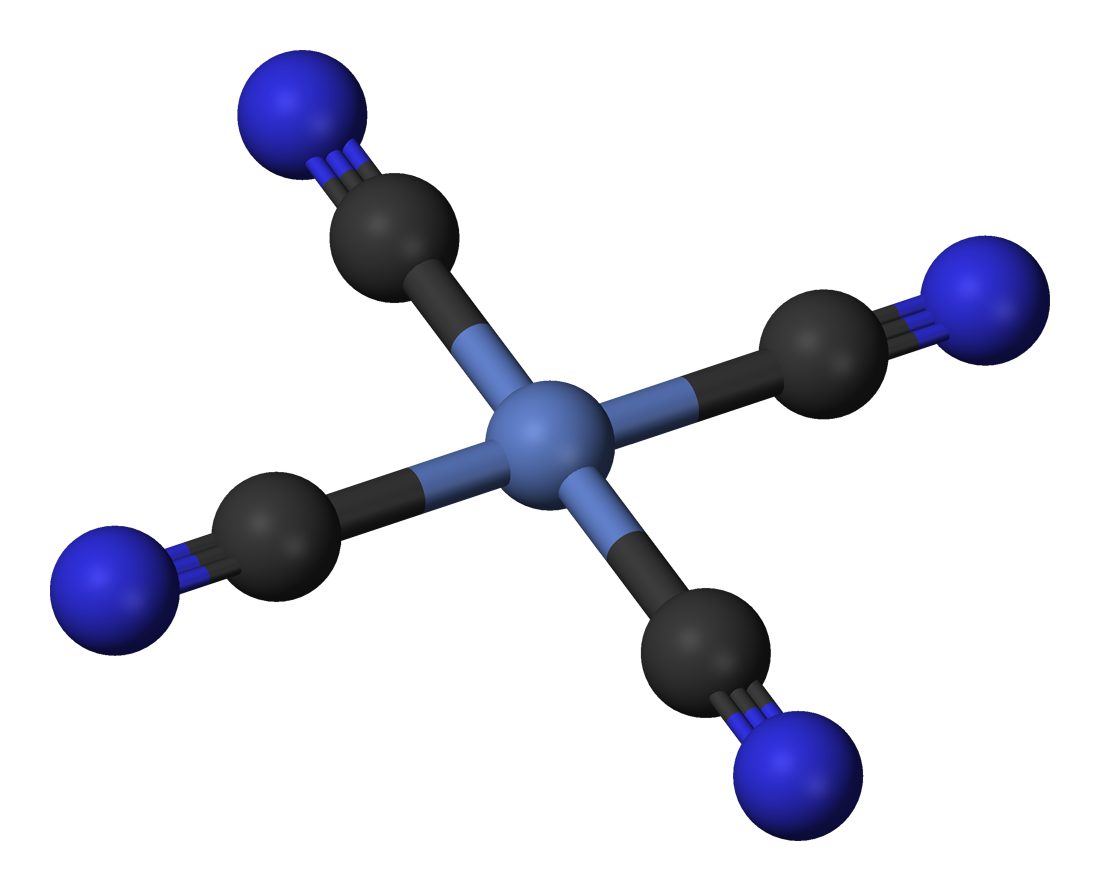
Ball-and-stick model of the tetracyanonickelate ion

Potassium tetracyanonickelate is prepared by treating aqueous solutions of nickel(II) salts with potassium cyanide. The synthesis is often conducted stepwise, beginning with precipitating solid nickel dicyanide coordination polymer. This route allows removal of excess potassium salts:

Ni^{2+} + 2 KCN → Ni(CN)_{2} + 2 K^{+}
Ni(CN)_{2} + 2 KCN → K_{2}[Ni(CN)_{4}]

This procedure yields the monohydrate. That solid dehydrates at 100 °C.

== Reactions ==
The N-terminus of the cyanide ligand is basic and nucleophilic. The complex binds four equivalents of boron trifluoride:

K_{2}[Ni(CN)_{4}] + 4 BF_{3} → K_{2}[Ni(CNBF_{3})_{4}]

Cyanide is a sufficient pi-acceptor ligand to allow reduction of K_{2}Ni(CN)_{4} to the Ni(0) derivative. Thus, potassium in anhydrous ammonia affords the tetraanionic, tetrahedral Ni(0) derivative [Ni(CN)_{4}]^{4-}.

K_{2}[Ni(CN)_{4}] + 2 K → K_{4}[Ni(CN)_{4}]

An intermediate in this conversion is K_{4}[Ni_{2}(CN)_{6}], which features an Ni-Ni bond.
