= Potassium ferrocyanide =

Chemical compound

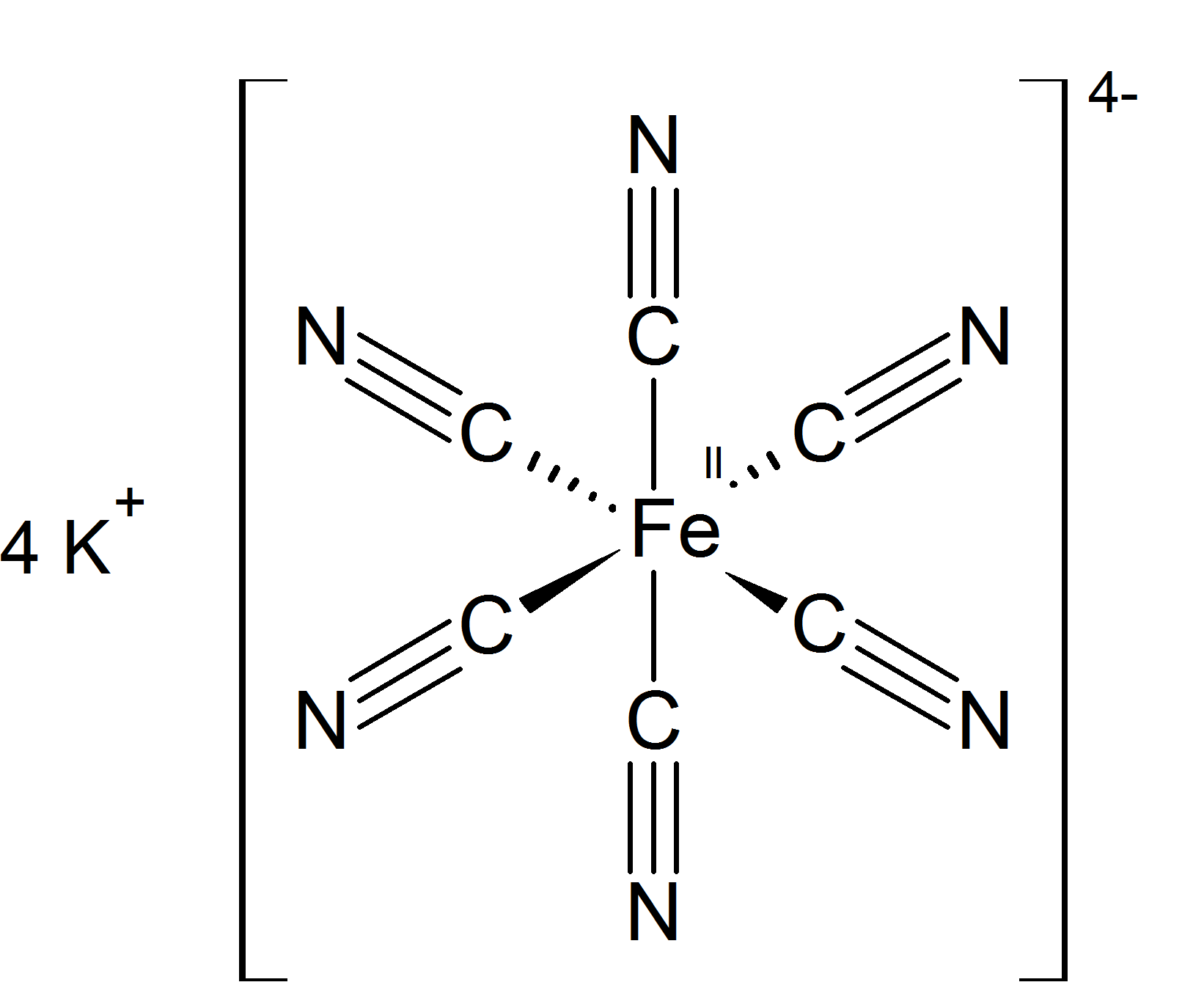

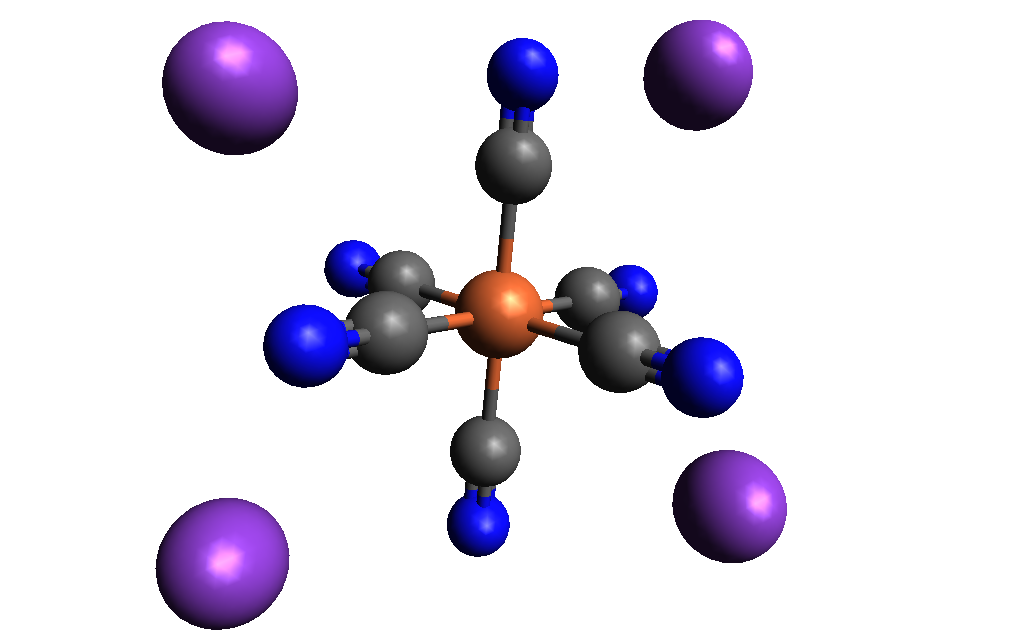

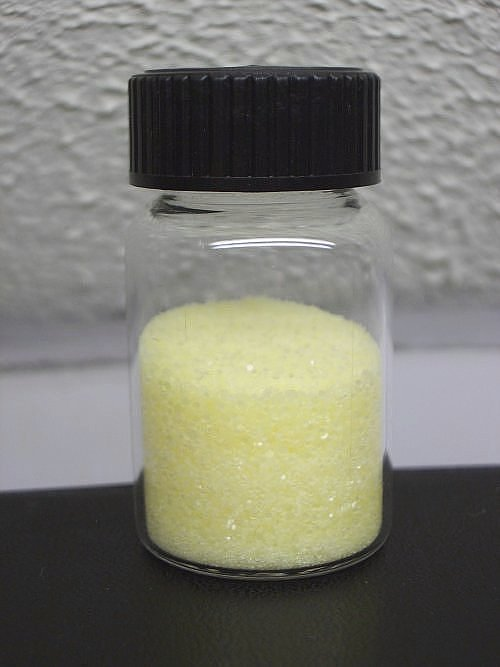
- Potassium ferrocyanide trihydrate

Names
- IUPAC name Potassium hexacyanidoferrate(II)
- Other names: (Yellow) Prussiate of Potash; Potassium hexacyanoferrate (II) trihydrate; Tetrapotassium ferrocyanide trihydrate; Ferrate hexacyano tetrapotassium trihydrate

Identifiers
CAS Number	13943-58-3 (anhydrous); 14459-95-1 (trihydrate)
3D model (JSmol)	Interactive image
ChemSpider	20162028
ECHA InfoCard	100.034.279
EC Number	237-722-2
E number	E536 (acidity regulators, ...)
PubChem CID	9605257 anhydrous; 161067 trihydrate
UNII	GTP1P30292 (anhydrous); 961WP42S65 (trihydrate)
CompTox Dashboard (EPA)	DTXSID60892423
- InChI: InChI=1S/6CN.Fe.4K.3H2O/c6*1-2;;;;;;;;/h;;;;;;;;;;;3*1H2/q6*-1;+2;4*+1;;; Key: UTYXJYFJPBYDKY-UHFFFAOYSA-N
- SMILES: [K+].[K+].N#C[Fe-4](C#N)(C#N)(C#N)(C#N)C#N.[K+].[K+]

Properties
Chemical formula	K_{4}[Fe(CN)_{6}]
Molar mass	368.35 g/mol (anhydrous); 422.388 g/mol (trihydrate)
Appearance	Light yellow, crystalline granules
Density	1.85 g/cm^{3} (trihydrate)
Boiling point	(decomposes)
Solubility in water	trihydrate 28.9 g/100 mL (20 °C)
Solubility	insoluble in ethanol, ether
Magnetic susceptibility (χ)	−130.0·10^{−6} cm^{3}/mol

Hazards
- GHS labelling
Pictograms	(GHS09: Environmental hazard)
Signal word	Warning
Hazard statements	H411
Precautionary statements	P273, P391, P501
NFPA 704 (fire diamond)	1 0 0
Flash point	Non-flammable
- Lethal dose or concentration (LD, LC)
LD_{50} (median dose)	1.6—3.2g/kg

Related compounds
Other anions	Potassium ferricyanide
Other cations	Ammonium ferrocyanide; Sodium ferrocyanide; Prussian blue
- Except where otherwise noted, data are given for materials in their standard state (at 25 °C [77 °F], 100 kPa). verify (what is ?) Infobox references

Potassium ferrocyanide is the inorganic compound with formula K_{4}[Fe(CN)_{6}]·3H_{2}O. It is the potassium salt of the coordination complex [Fe(CN)_{6}]^{4−}. This salt forms lemon-yellow monoclinic crystals.

== Synthesis ==
In 1752, the French chemist Pierre Joseph Macquer (1718–1784) first reported the preparation of potassium ferrocyanide, which he achieved by reacting Prussian blue (iron(III) ferrocyanide) with potassium hydroxide.

=== Modern production ===
Potassium ferrocyanide is produced industrially from hydrogen cyanide, iron(II) chloride, and calcium hydroxide, the combination of which affords Ca_{2}[Fe(CN)_{6}]·11H_{2}O. This solution is then treated with potassium salts to precipitate the mixed calcium-potassium salt CaK_{2}[Fe(CN)_{6}], which in turn is treated with potassium carbonate to give the tetrapotassium salt.

=== Historical production ===
Historically, the compound was manufactured from nitrogenous organic material, iron filings, and potassium carbonate. Common nitrogen and carbon sources were torrified horn, leather scrap, offal, or dried blood. It was also obtained commercially from gasworks spent oxide (purification of city gas from hydrogen cyanide).

== Chemical reactions ==
Treatment of potassium ferrocyanide with nitric acid gives H_{2}[Fe(NO)(CN)_{5}]. After neutralization of this intermediate with sodium carbonate, red crystals of sodium nitroprusside can be selectively crystallized.

Upon treatment with chlorine gas, potassium ferrocyanide converts to potassium ferricyanide:

2 K_{4}[Fe(CN)_{6}] + Cl_{2} → 2 K_{3}[Fe(CN)_{6}] + 2 KCl

This reaction can be used to remove potassium ferrocyanide from a solution.

A famous reaction involves treatment with ferric salts, most commonly iron(III) chloride, to give Prussian blue. In the reaction with iron(III) chloride, producing potassium chloride as a side-product:

3 K_{4}[Fe(CN)_{6}] + 4 FeCl_{3} → Fe_{4}[Fe(CN)_{6}]_{3} + 12 KCl

With a composition of Fe^{III}_{4}[Fe^{II}(CN)_{6}]_{3}, this insoluble, deeply coloured material provides the blue used in blueprinting, as well as in paintings such as The Great Wave off Kanagawa and The Starry Night.

== Applications ==
Potassium ferrocyanide finds many niche applications in industry. It and the related sodium salt are widely used as anticaking agents for both road salt and table salt. The potassium and sodium ferrocyanides are also used in the purification of tin and the separation of copper from molybdenum ores. Potassium ferrocyanide is used in the production of wine and citric acid.

In the EU, potassium ferrocyanides (E 535–538) were, as of 2017, solely authorised in two food categories as salt additives.

It can also be used in animal feed.

In the laboratory, potassium ferrocyanide is used to determine the concentration of potassium permanganate, a compound often used in titrations based on redox reactions. Potassium ferrocyanide is used in a mixture with potassium ferricyanide and phosphate buffered solution to provide a buffer for beta-galactosidase, which is used to cleave X-Gal, giving a bright blue visualization where an antibody (or other molecule), conjugated to Beta-gal, has bonded to its target. On reacting with Fe(3) it gives a Prussian blue colour. Thus it is used as an identifying reagent for iron in labs.

Potassium ferrocyanide can be used as a fertilizer for plants.

Prior to 1900, before the invention of the Castner process, potassium ferrocyanide was the most important source of alkali metal cyanides. In this historical process, potassium cyanide was produced by decomposing potassium ferrocyanide:

K_{4}[Fe(CN)_{6}] → 4 KCN + FeC_{2} + N_{2}

Potassium ferrocyanide is a component of white gunpowder or Augendre's powder, a blasting powder of high energy. It comprises 28 parts yellow potassium ferrocyanide, 23 parts cane sugar, and 49 parts of potassium chlorate, mixed under absolute alcohol to prevent premature detonation.

Potassium ferrocyanide is a main component of the traditional formula for the 19th century Cyanotype photographic process.

== Structure ==
Like other metal cyanides, solid potassium ferrocyanide, both as the hydrate and anhydrous salts, has a complicated polymeric structure. The polymer consists of octahedral [Fe(CN)_{6}]^{4−} centers crosslinked with K^{+} ions that are bound to the CN ligands. The K^{+}---NC linkages break when the solid is dissolved in water.

=== Toxicity ===
The toxicity in rats is low, with lethal dose (LD_{50}) at 1.6—3.2g/kg. The kidneys are the organ for ferrocyanide toxicity.

== See also ==
- Ferrocyanide
- Potassium ferricyanide
- Ferricyanide
