= Sodium aluminosilicate =

Names
- IUPAC name aluminum sodium dioxido(oxo)silane
- Other names: Aluminosilicic acid; aluminum sodium silicate

Identifiers
CAS Number	1344-00-9
3D model (JSmol)	Interactive image
ChemSpider	14398681
ECHA InfoCard	100.014.259
EC Number	215-684-8
E number	E554 (acidity regulators, ...)
PubChem CID	19758701
UNII	058TS43PSM
CompTox Dashboard (EPA)	DTXSID7026021
- InChI: InChI=1S/Al.Na.2O3Si/c;;2*1-4(2)3/q+3;+1;2*-2 Key: URGAHOPLAPQHLN-UHFFFAOYSA-N
- SMILES: [O-][Si](=O)[O-].[O-][Si](=O)[O-].[Na+].[Al+3]
- Except where otherwise noted, data are given for materials in their standard state (at 25 °C [77 °F], 100 kPa). Infobox references

Sodium aluminosilicate refers to compounds which contain sodium, aluminium, silicon and oxygen, and which may also contain water. These include synthetic amorphous sodium aluminosilicate, a few naturally occurring minerals and synthetic zeolites. Synthetic amorphous sodium aluminosilicate is widely used as a food additive, E 554.

== Amorphous sodium aluminosilicate ==
This substance is produced with a wide range of compositions and has many different applications. It is encountered as an additive E 554 in food where it acts as an anticaking (free flow) agent. As it is manufactured with a range of compositions it is not strictly a chemical compound with a fixed stoichiometry. One supplier quotes a typical analysis for one of their products as 14SiO_{2}·Al_{2}O_{3}·Na_{2}O·3H_{2}O,(Na_{2}Al_{2}Si_{14}O_{32}·3H_{2}O).

The US FDA has as of April 1, 2012 approved sodium aluminosilicate (sodium silicoaluminate) for direct contact with consumable items under 21 CFR 182.2727. Sodium aluminosilicate is used as molecular sieve in medicinal containers to keep contents dry.

Sodium aluminosilicate may also be listed as:

- aluminium sodium salt
- sodium silicoaluminate
- aluminosilicic acid, sodium salt
- sodium aluminium silicate
- aluminum sodium silicate
- sodium silico aluminate
- sasil

== As a problem in industrial processes ==
The formation of sodium aluminosilicate makes the Bayer process uneconomical for bauxites high in silica.

== Minerals sometimes called sodium aluminosilicate ==
Naturally occurring minerals that are sometimes given the chemical name sodium aluminosilicate include albite (NaAlSi_{3}O_{8}, an end-member of the plagioclase series) and jadeite (NaAlSi_{2}O_{6}).

== Synthetic zeolites sometimes called sodium aluminosilicate ==
Synthetic zeolites have complex structures and examples (with structural formulae) are:

- Na_{12}Al_{12}Si_{12}O_{48}·27H_{2}O, zeolite A (Linde type A sodium form, NaA), used in laundry detergents
- Na_{16}Al_{16}Si_{32}O_{96}·16H_{2}O, Analcime, IUPAC code ANA
- Na_{12}Al_{12}Si_{12}O_{48}·q H_{2}O, Losod
- Na_{384}Al_{384}Si_{384}O_{1536}·518H_{2}O, Linde type N
