= Anticaking agent =

Additive used to prevent the formation of lumps

An anticaking agent is an additive placed in powdered or granulated materials, such as table salt or confectioneries, to prevent the formation of lumps (caking) and for easing packaging, transport, flowability, and consumption. Caking mechanisms depend on the nature of the material. Crystalline solids often cake by formation of liquid bridge and subsequent fusion of microcrystals. Amorphous materials can cake by glass transitions and changes in viscosity. Polymorphic phase transitions can also induce caking.

Some anticaking agents function by absorbing excess moisture or by coating particles and making them water-repellent. Calcium silicate (CaSiO_{3}), a commonly used anti-caking agent, added to e.g. table salt, absorbs both water and oil.

Anticaking agents are also used in non-food items such as road salt, fertilisers, cosmetics, and detergents.

Some studies suggest that anticaking agents may have a negative effect on the nutritional content of food; one such study indicated that most anti-caking agents result in the additional degradation of vitamin C added to food.

== Examples ==
An anticaking agent in salt is denoted in the ingredients, for example, as "anti-caking agent (554)", which is sodium aluminosilicate. This product is present in many commercial table salts as well as dried milk, egg mixes, sugar products, flours and spices. In Europe, sodium ferrocyanide (535) and potassium ferrocyanide (536) are more common anticaking agents in table salt. "Natural" anticaking agents used in more expensive table salt include calcium carbonate and the magnesium carbonate.

Diatomaceous earth, mostly consisting of silicon dioxide (SiO_{2}), may also be used as an anticaking agent in animal foods, typically mixed at 2% rate of a product dry weight.

== List of anticaking agents ==
The most widely used anticaking agents include the stearates of calcium and magnesium, silica and various silicates, talc, as well as flour and starch. Ferrocyanides are used for table salt. The following anticaking agents are listed in order by their number in the Codex Alimentarius by the Food and Agriculture Organization of the UN.

- 341 tricalcium phosphate
- 460(ii) powdered cellulose
- 470b magnesium stearate
- 500 sodium bicarbonate
- 535 sodium ferrocyanide
- 536 potassium ferrocyanide
- 538 calcium ferrocyanide
- 542 calcium phosphate
- 550 sodium silicate
- 551 silicon dioxide
- 552 calcium silicate
- 553a magnesium trisilicate
- 553b talcum powder
- 554 sodium aluminosilicate
- 555 potassium aluminium silicate
- 556 calcium aluminosilicate
- 558 bentonite
- 559 aluminium silicate
- 570 stearic acid
- 900 polydimethylsiloxane
