= Palladium dicyanide =

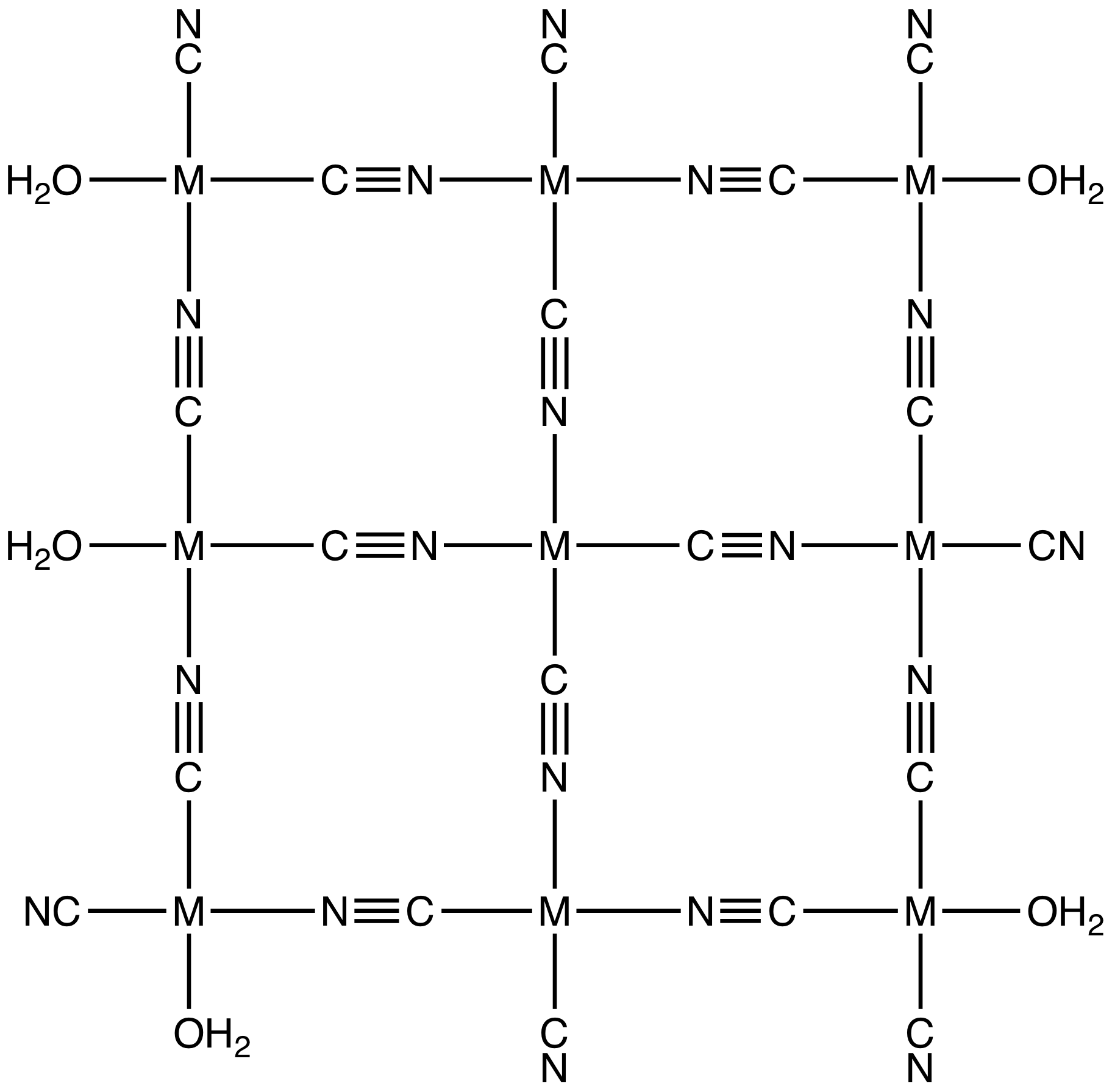

Names
- IUPAC name Palladium(2+) dicyanide

Identifiers
CAS Number	2035-66-7
3D model (JSmol)	Interactive image
ChemSpider	67420
ECHA InfoCard	100.016.364
PubChem CID	6093464
CompTox Dashboard (EPA)	DTXSID2062113
- InChI: InChI=1S/2CN.Pd/c2*1-2;/q2*-1;+2 Key: XDASSWBZWFFNPX-UHFFFAOYSA-N; InChI=1/2CN.Pd/c2*1-2;/q2*-1;+2 Key: XDASSWBZWFFNPX-UHFFFAOYAK
- SMILES: [Pd+2].[C-]#N.[C-]#N

Properties
Chemical formula	Pd(CN)_{2}
Molar mass	158.455 g/mol
Appearance	pale grey powder
Density	2.813 g/cm^{3} (He pycnometery)
Melting point	decomposes above 400C, compleat by 460C under N_{2}
Boiling point	N/A
Solubility in water	insoluble in water, forms [Pd(CN)_{4}]^{2-}_{(aq)} in alkalimetal cyanide solutions
- Except where otherwise noted, data are given for materials in their standard state (at 25 °C [77 °F], 100 kPa). Infobox references

Palladium(II) dicyanide is the inorganic compound with the formula Pd(CN)_{2}. A grey solid, it is a coordination polymer. It was the first palladium compound isolated in pure form. In his attempts to produce pure platinum metal in 1804, W. H. Wollaston added mercuric cyanide to a solution prepared by dissolving impure platinum in aqua regia. This precipitated palladium cyanide which was then ignited to recover palladium metal—a new element.

== Structure ==
It had long been suspected that the structure of palladium cyanide consists of square planar Pd(II) centers linked by cyanide bridging ligands, which are bonded through both the carbon and nitrogen atoms. The CN vibration in the infrared spectra of Pd(CN)_{2}, at 2222 cm^{−1}, is typical of bridging cyanide ion. It is now known that the compound commonly known as "palladium(II) cyanide" is a nanocrystalline material better described using the formula Pd(CN)_{2}^{.}0.29H_{2}O. The interior of the sheets do indeed consist of square-planar palladium ions linked by head-to-tail disordered bridging cyanide groups to form 4,4-nets. These sheets are approximately 3 nm x 3 nm in size and are terminated by an equal number of water and cyanide groups maintaining the charge neutrality of the sheets. These sheets then stack with very little long range order resulting in Bragg diffraction patterns with very broad peaks. The Pd-C and Pd-N bond lengths, determined using total neutron diffraction, are both 1.98 Å.

== Properties and reactions ==
Palladium dicyanide is insoluble in water with a solubility product of log K_{sp} = −42.

The equilibrium constant for the competition reaction

PdL^{2+} + 4 CN^{−} ⇌ [Pd(CN)_{4}]^{2−} + L

In the above equation, L is 1,4,8,11-tetraazaundecane ("2,3,2-tet") was found to have a value of log K = 14.5. Combination with the formation of the palladium complex with the tetradentate ligand

[Pd(H_{2}O)_{4}]^{2+} + L ⇌ PdL^{2+} + 4 H_{2}O, log K = 47.9

gives

[Pd(H_{2}O)_{4}]^{2+} + 4 CN^{−} ⇌ [Pd(CN)_{4}]^{2−} + 4 H_{2}O, log β_{4} = 62.3.

This appears to be the highest formation constant known for any metal ion.

The affinity of Pd(II) for cyanide is so great that palladium metal is attacked by cyanide solutions:

Pd(s) + 2 H^{+} + 4 CN^{−} ⇌ [Pd(CN)_{4}]^{2−} + H_{2}

This reaction is reminiscent of the "cyanide process" for the extraction of gold, although in the latter reaction O_{2} is proposed to be involved, to give H_{2}O.

Exchange of between free cyanide ion and [Pd(CN)_{4}]^{2−} has been evaluated by ^{13}C NMR spectroscopy. That exchange occurs at all illustrates the ability of some compounds to be labile (fast reactions) but also stable (high formation constants). The reaction rate is described as follows:

rate = k_{2}[M(CN)_{4}^{2−}][CN^{−}], where k_{2} 120 M^{−1−}s^{−1}

The bimolecular kinetics implicate a so-called associative pathway. The associative mechanism of exchange entails rate-limiting attack of cyanide on [Pd(CN)_{4}]^{2−}, possibly with the intermediacy of a highly reactive pentacoordinate species [Pd(CN)_{5}]^{3−}. By comparison, the rate constant for [Ni(CN)_{4}]^{2−} is > 500,000 M^{−1−}s^{−1}, whereas [Pt(CN)_{4}]^{2−}exchanges more slowly at 26 M^{−1}s^{−1}. Such associative reactions are characterized by large negative entropies of activation, in this case: -178 and -143 kJ/(mol·K) for Pd and Pt, respectively.

Pd(CN)_{2} has few uses. It has been demonstrated to facilitate the synthesis of alkenyl nitriles from olefins. and as a catalyst in the regioselective reaction between cyanotrimethylsilane and oxiranes.

== See also ==
- Nickel dicyanide
