= Ferricyanide =

Anion in which a Fe3+ ion is complexed by 6 CN– ions

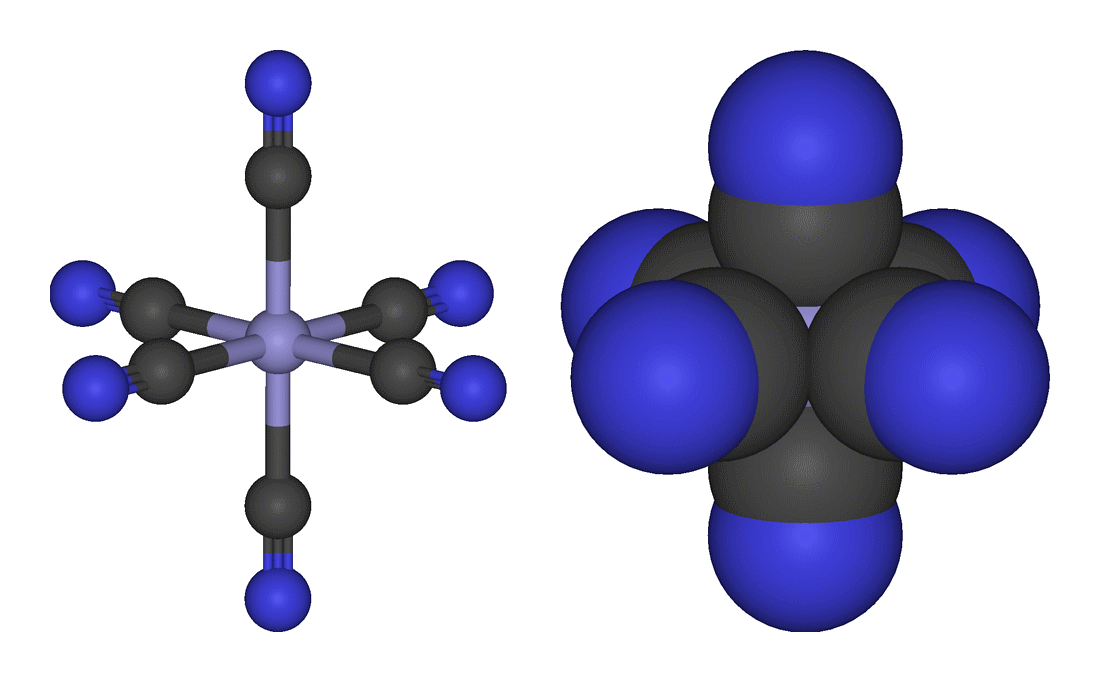

Names
- IUPAC name iron(3+) hexacyanide
- Systematic IUPAC name hexacyanidoferrate(III)
- Other names: Ferric hexacyanide; Hexacyanidoferrate(3−); Hexacyanoferrate(III)

Identifiers
CAS Number	13408-62-3
3D model (JSmol)	Interactive image
ChEBI	CHEBI:5020
ChemSpider	388349
KEGG	C00324
PubChem CID	439210
UNII	NB6Y5532P6
CompTox Dashboard (EPA)	DTXSID70894190
- InChI: InChI=1S/6CN.Fe/c6*1-2;/q6*-1;+3 Key: YAGKRVSRTSUGEY-UHFFFAOYSA-N
- SMILES: N#C[Fe-3](C#N)(C#N)(C#N)(C#N)C#N

Properties
Chemical formula	[Fe(CN)_{6}]^{3−}

Related compounds
Other cations	Hexacyanonickelate(III)
Related compounds	Ferrocyanide
- Except where otherwise noted, data are given for materials in their standard state (at 25 °C [77 °F], 100 kPa). verify (what is ?) Infobox references

Ferricyanide is the name of the anion [Fe(CN)_{6}]^{3−}. It is also called hexacyanoferrate(III) and in rare, but systematic nomenclature, hexacyanidoferrate(III). The most common salt of this anion is potassium ferricyanide, a red crystalline material that is used as an oxidant in organic chemistry.

== Properties ==
[Fe(CN)_{6}]^{3−} consists of a Fe^{3+} center bound in octahedral geometry to six cyanide ligands. The complex has O_{h} symmetry. The iron is low-spin and easily reduced to the related ferrocyanide ion [Fe(CN)_{6}]^{4−}, which is a ferrous (Fe^{2+}) derivative. This redox couple is reversible and entails no making or breaking of Fe–C bonds:

[Fe(CN)_{6}]^{3−} + e^{−} ⇌ [Fe(CN)_{6}]^{4−}

This redox couple is a standard in electrochemistry.

Compared to main group cyanides like potassium cyanide, ferricyanides are less toxic because of the strong bond between the cyanide ion (CN^{−}) and the Fe^{3+}. They do react with mineral acids, however, to release highly toxic hydrogen cyanide gas.

== Uses ==
Treatment of ferricyanide with iron(II) salts affords the pigment Prussian blue, the traditional color of blueprints.
