= Coordination polymer =

Polymer consisting of repeating units of a coordination complex

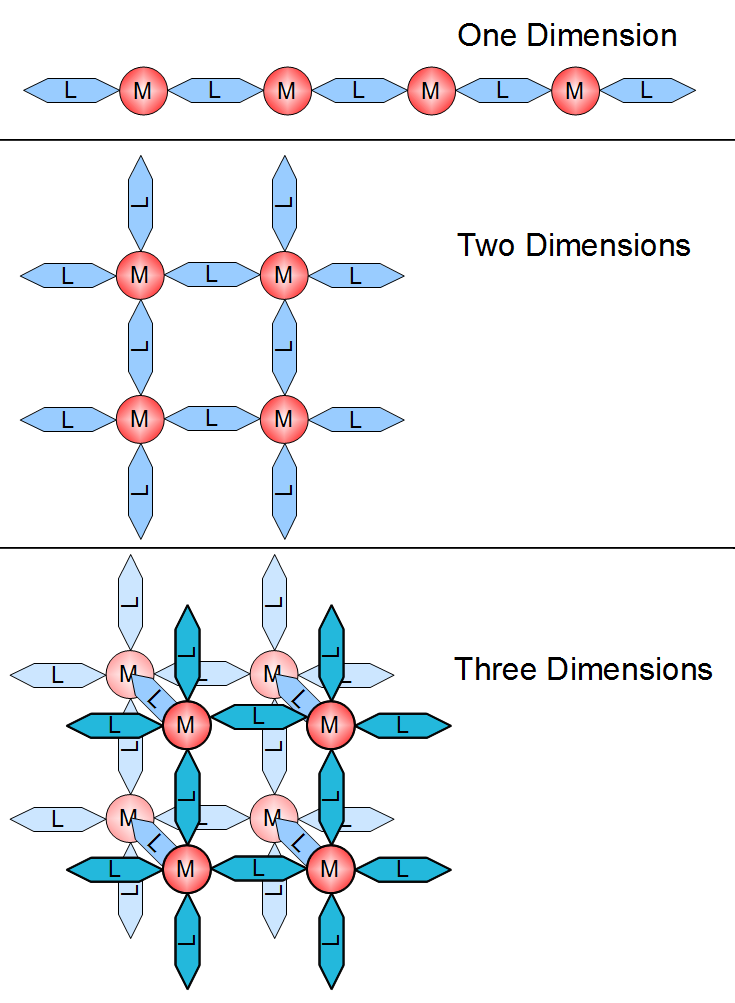
Figure 1. An illustration of 1- 2- and 3-dimensionality.

A coordination polymer is an inorganic or organometallic polymer structure containing metal cation centers linked by ligands. More formally a coordination polymer is a coordination compound with repeating coordination entities extending in 1, 2, or 3 dimensions.

It can also be described as a polymer whose repeat units are coordination complexes. Coordination polymers contain the subclass coordination networks that are coordination compounds extending, through repeating coordination entities, in 1 dimension, but with cross-links between two or more individual chains, loops, or spiro-links, or a coordination compound extending through repeating coordination entities in 2 or 3 dimensions. A subclass of these are the metal-organic frameworks, or MOFs, that are coordination networks with organic ligands containing potential voids.

Coordination polymers are relevant to many fields, having many potential applications.

Coordination polymers can be classified in a number of ways according to their structure and composition. One important classification is referred to as dimensionality. A structure can be determined to be one-, two- or three-dimensional, depending on the number of directions in space the array extends in. A one-dimensional structure extends in a straight line (along the × axis); a two-dimensional structure extends in a plane (two directions, × and y axes); and a three-dimensional structure extends in all three directions (x, y, and z axes). This is depicted in Figure 1.

== History ==
The work of Alfred Werner and his contemporaries laid the groundwork for the study of coordination polymers. Many time-honored materials are now recognized as coordination polymers. These include the cyanide complexes Prussian blue and Hofmann clathrates.

== Synthesis and propagation ==
Coordination polymers are often prepared by self-assembly, involving crystallization of a metal salt with a ligand. The mechanisms of crystal engineering and molecular self-assembly are relevant.

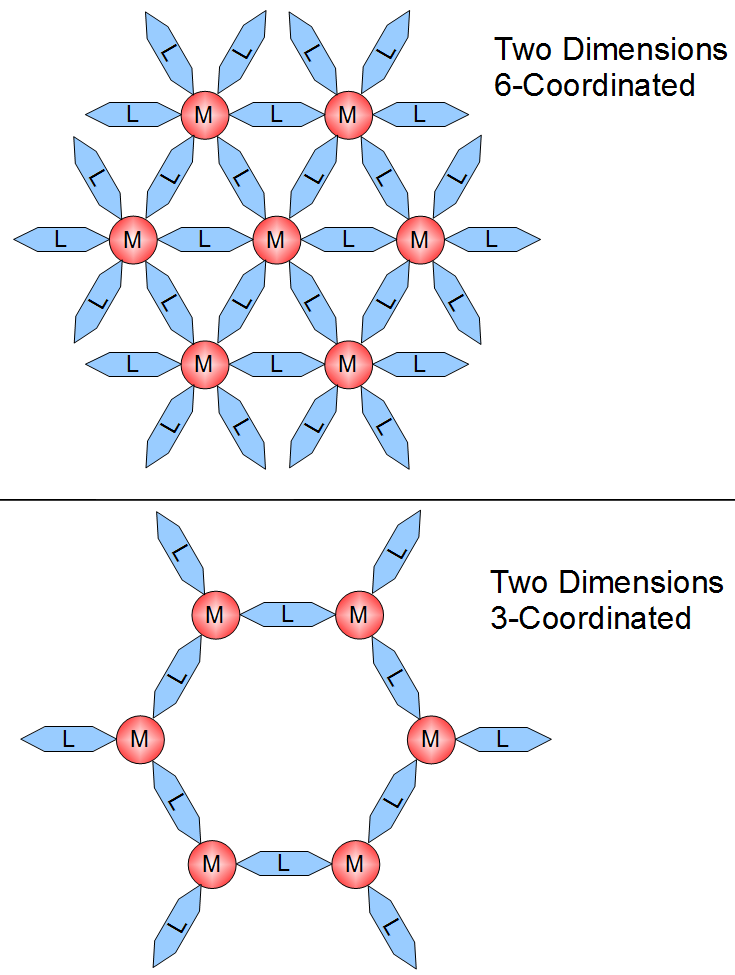
Figure 2. Shows planar geometries with 3 coordination and 6 coordination.

The structure and dimensionality of the coordination polymer are determined by the linkers and the coordination geometry of the metal center. Coordination numbers are most often between 2 and 10. Examples of various coordination numbers are shown in planar geometry in Figure 2. In Figure 1 the 1D structure is 2-coordinated, the planar is 4-coordinated, and the 3D is 6-coordinated.

== Metal centers ==
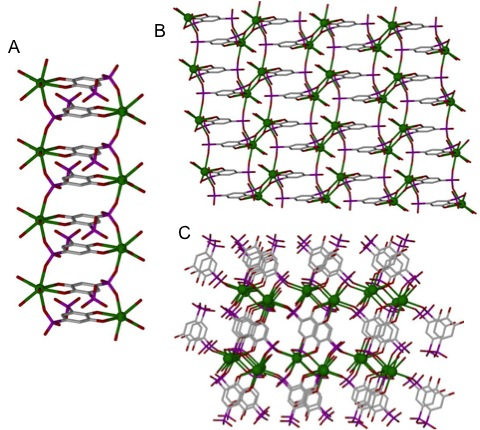
Figure 3. Three coordination polymers of different dimensionality. All three were made using the same ligand (4,5-dihydroxybenzene-1,3-disulfonate (L)), but different metal cations. All of the metals come from Group 2 on the periodic table (alkaline earth metals) and in this case, dimensionality increases with cation size and polarizability. A. [Ca(L)(H_{2}O)_{4}]•H_{2}O B. [Sr(L)(H_{2}O)4]•H_{2}O C.[Ba(L)(H_{2}O)]•H_{2}O In each case, the metal is represented in green.

Metal centers, often called nodes or hubs, bond to a specific number of linkers at well defined angles. The number of linkers bound to a node is known as the coordination number, which, along with the angles they are held at, determines the dimensionality of the structure. The coordination number and coordination geometry of a metal center is determined by the nonuniform distribution of electron density around it, and in general the coordination number increases with cation size. Several models, most notably hybridization model and molecular orbital theory, use the Schrödinger equation to predict and explain coordination geometry, however this is difficult in part because of the complex effect of environment on electron density distribution.

=== Transition metals ===
Transition metals are commonly used as nodes. Partially filled d orbitals, either in the atom or ion, can hybridize differently depending on environment. This electronic structure causes some of them to exhibit multiple coordination geometries, particularly copper and gold ions which as neutral atoms have full d-orbitals in their outer shells.

=== Lanthanides ===
Lanthanides are large atoms with coordination numbers varying from 7 to 14. Their coordination environment can be difficult to predict, making them challenging to use as nodes. They offer the possibility of incorporating luminescent components.

=== Alkali metals and alkaline earth metals ===
Alkali metals and alkaline earth metals exist as stable cations. Alkali metals readily form cations with stable valence shells, giving them different coordination behavior than lanthanides and transition metals. They are strongly affected by the counterion from the salt used in synthesis, which is difficult to avoid. The coordination polymers shown in Figure 3 are all group two metals. In this case, the dimensionality of these structures increases as the radius of the metal increases down the group (from calcium to strontium to barium).

== Ligands ==
Coordination polymers require ligands with the ability to form multiple coordination bonds, i.e. act as bridges between metal centers. Many bridging ligands are known. They range from polyfunctional heterocycles, such as pyrazine, to simple halides. Almost any type of atom with a lone pair of electrons can serve as a ligand.

Very elaborate ligands have been investigated. and phosphorus, have been observed.

=== Structural orientation ===
1,2-Bis(4-pyridyl)ethane is a flexible ligand, which can exist in either gauche or anti conformations.

Ligands can be flexible or rigid. A rigid ligand is one that has no freedom to rotate around bonds or reorient within a structure. Flexible ligands can bend, rotate around bonds, and reorient themselves. These different conformations create more variety in the structure. There are examples of coordination polymers that include two configurations of the same ligand within one structure, as well as two separate structures where the only difference between them is ligand orientation.

=== Ligand length ===
A length of the ligand can be an important factor in determining possibility for formation of a polymeric structure versus non-polymeric (mono- or oligomeric) structures.

== Other factors ==
=== Counterion ===
Besides metal and ligand choice, there are many other factors that affect the structure of the coordination polymer. For example, most metal centers are positively charged ions which exist as salts. The counterion in the salt can affect the overall structure. For example, when silver salts such as AgNO_{3}, AgBF_{4}, AgClO_{4}, AgPF_{6}, AgAsF_{6} and AgSbF_{6} are all crystallized with the same ligand, the structures vary in terms of the coordination environment of the metal, as well as the dimensionality of the entire coordination polymer.

=== Crystallization environment ===
Additionally, variations in the crystallization environment can also change the structure. Changes in pH, exposure to light, or changes in temperature can all change the resulting structure. Influences on the structure based on changes in crystallization environment are determined on a case by case basis.

=== Guest molecules ===
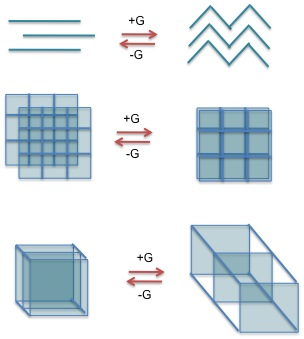
The addition and removal of guest molecules can have a large effect on the resulting structure of a coordination polymer. A few examples are (top) change of a linear 1D chain to a zigzag pattern, (middle) staggered 2D sheets to stacked, and (bottom) 3D cubes become more widely spaced.

The structure of coordination polymers often incorporates empty space in the form of pores or channels. This empty space is thermodynamically unfavorable. In order to stabilize the structure and prevent collapse, the pores or channels are often occupied by guest molecules. Guest molecules do not form bonds with the surrounding lattice, but sometimes interact via intermolecular forces, such as hydrogen bonding or pi stacking. Most often, the guest molecule will be the solvent that the coordination polymer was crystallized in, but can really be anything (other salts present, atmospheric gases such as oxygen, nitrogen, carbon dioxide, etc.) The presence of the guest molecule can sometimes influence the structure by supporting a pore or channel, where otherwise none would exist.

== Applications ==
Coordination polymers are found in some commercialized as dyes.. Metal complex dyes using copper or chromium are commonly used for producing dull colors. Tridentate ligand dyes are useful because they are more stable than their bi- or mono-dentate counterparts.

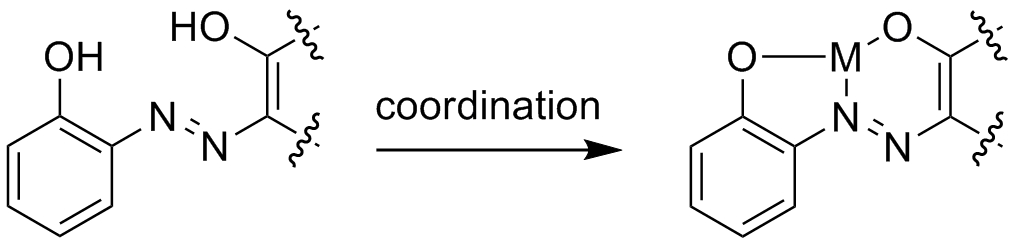

Some early commercialized coordination polymers are the Hofmann compounds, which have the formula Ni(CN)_{4}Ni(NH_{3})_{2}. These materials crystallize with small aromatic guests (benzene, certain xylenes), and this selectivity has been exploited commercially for the separation of these hydrocarbons.

== Research trends ==
=== Molecular storage ===
Although not yet practical, porous coordination polymers have potential as molecular sieves in parallel with porous carbon and zeolites. The size and shapes of the pore can be controlled by the linker size and the connecting ligands' length and functional groups. To modify the pore size in order to achieve effective adsorption, nonvolatile guests are intercalated in the porous coordination polymer space to decrease the pore size. Active surface guests can also be used contribute to adsorption. For example, the large-pore MOF-177, 11.8 Å in diameter, can be doped by C_{60} molecules (6.83 Å in diameter) or polymers with a highly conjugated system in order to increase the surface area for H_{2} adsorption.

Flexible porous coordination polymers are potentially attractive for molecular storage, since their pore sizes can be altered by physical changes. An example of this might be seen in a polymer that contains gas molecules in its normal state, but upon compression the polymer collapses and releases the stored molecules. Depending on the structure of the polymer, it is possible that the structure be flexible enough that collapsing the pores is reversible and the polymer can be reused to uptake the gas molecules again. The Metal-organic framework page has a detailed section dealing with H_{2} gas storage.

=== Luminescence ===
Luminescent coordination polymers typically feature organic chromophoric ligands, which absorb light and then pass the excitation energy to the metal ion. For ligands that fluoresce without the presence of the metal linker (not due to LMCT), the intense photoluminescence emission of these materials tend to be magnitudes of order higher than that of the free ligand alone. These materials are candidates for light emitting diode (LED) devices. The dramatic increase in fluorescence is caused by the increase in rigidity and asymmetry of the ligand when coordinated to the metal center.

=== Electrical conductivity ===
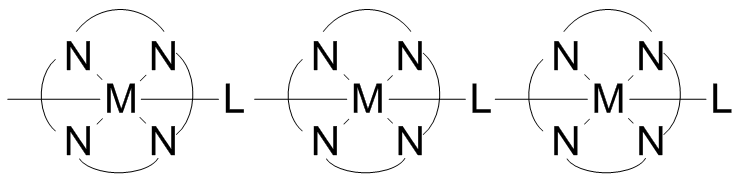
Structure of coordination polymers that exhibit conductivity, where M = Fe, Ru, OS; L = octaethylporphyrinato or pthalocyaninato; N belongs to pyrazine or bipyridine.

Coordination polymers can have short inorganic and conjugated organic bridges in their structures, which provide pathways for electrical conduction. example of such coordination polymers are conductive metal organic frameworks. Some one-dimensional coordination polymers built as shown in the figure exhibit conductivities in a range of 1 × 10^{−6} to 2 × 10^{−1} S/cm. The conductivity is due to the interaction between the metal d-orbital and the pi* level of the bridging ligand. In some cases coordination polymers can have semiconductor behavior. Three-dimensional structures consisting of sheets of silver-containing polymers demonstrate semi-conductivity when the metal centers are aligned, and conduction decreases as the silver atoms go from parallel to perpendicular.

=== Magnetism ===
Coordination polymers exhibit many kinds of magnetism. Antiferromagnetism, ferrimagnetism, and ferromagnetism are cooperative phenomena of the magnetic spins within a solid arising from coupling between the spins of the paramagnetic centers. In order to allow efficient magnetic, metal ions should be bridged by small ligands allowing for short metal-metal contacts (such as oxo, cyano, and azido bridges).

=== Sensor capability ===
Coordination polymers can also show color changes upon the change of solvent molecules incorporated into the structure. An example of this would be the two Co coordination polymers of the [Re_{6}S_{8}(CN)_{6}]^{4−} cluster that contains water ligands that coordinate to the cobalt atoms. This originally orange solution turns either purple or green with the replacement of water with tetrahydrofuran, and blue upon the addition of diethyl ether. The polymer can thus act as a solvent sensor that physically changes color in the presence of certain solvents. The color changes are attributed to the incoming solvent displacing the water ligands on the cobalt atoms, resulting in a change of their geometry from octahedral to tetrahedral.
