= Cyanonickelate =

Class of chemical compounds

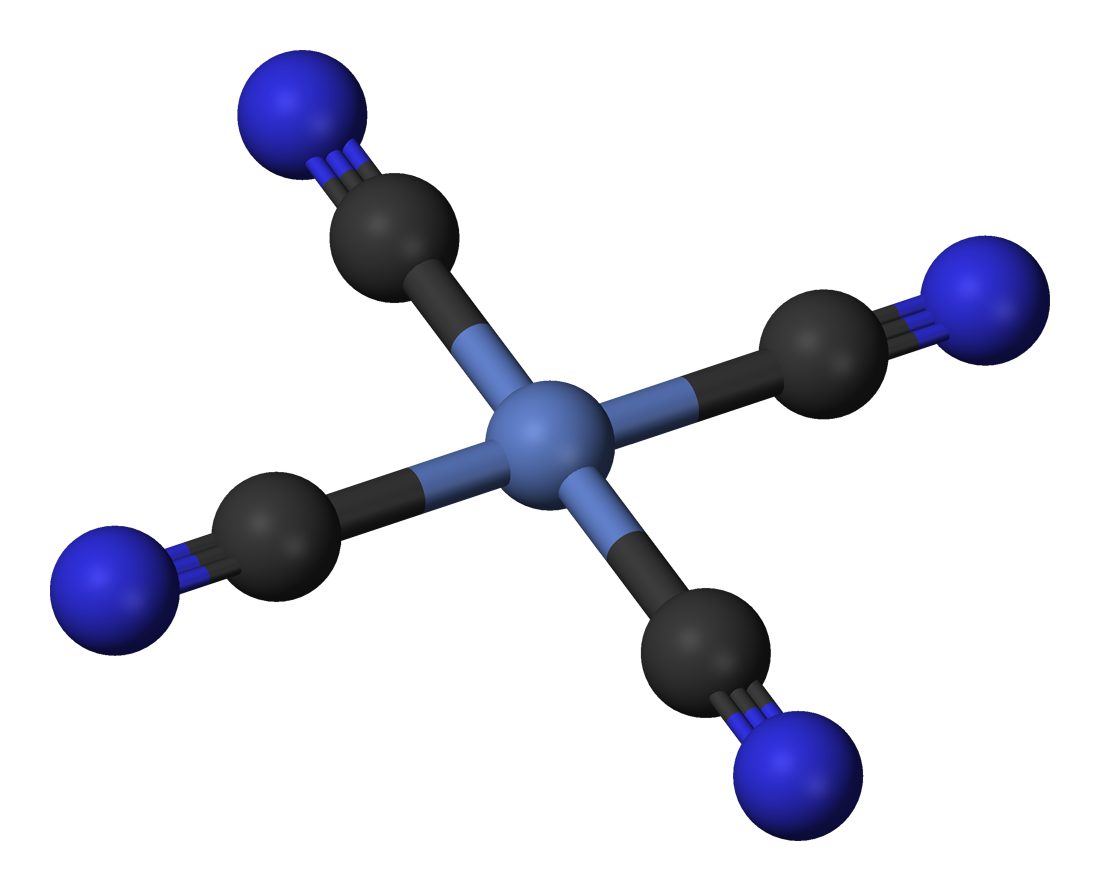
Four cyano groups are arranged in a square in the tetracyanonickelate ion.

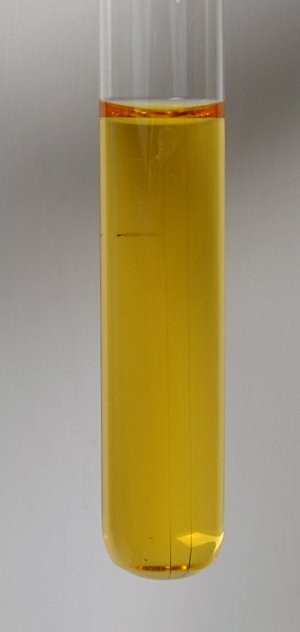
Potassium tetracyanonickelate(II) solution.

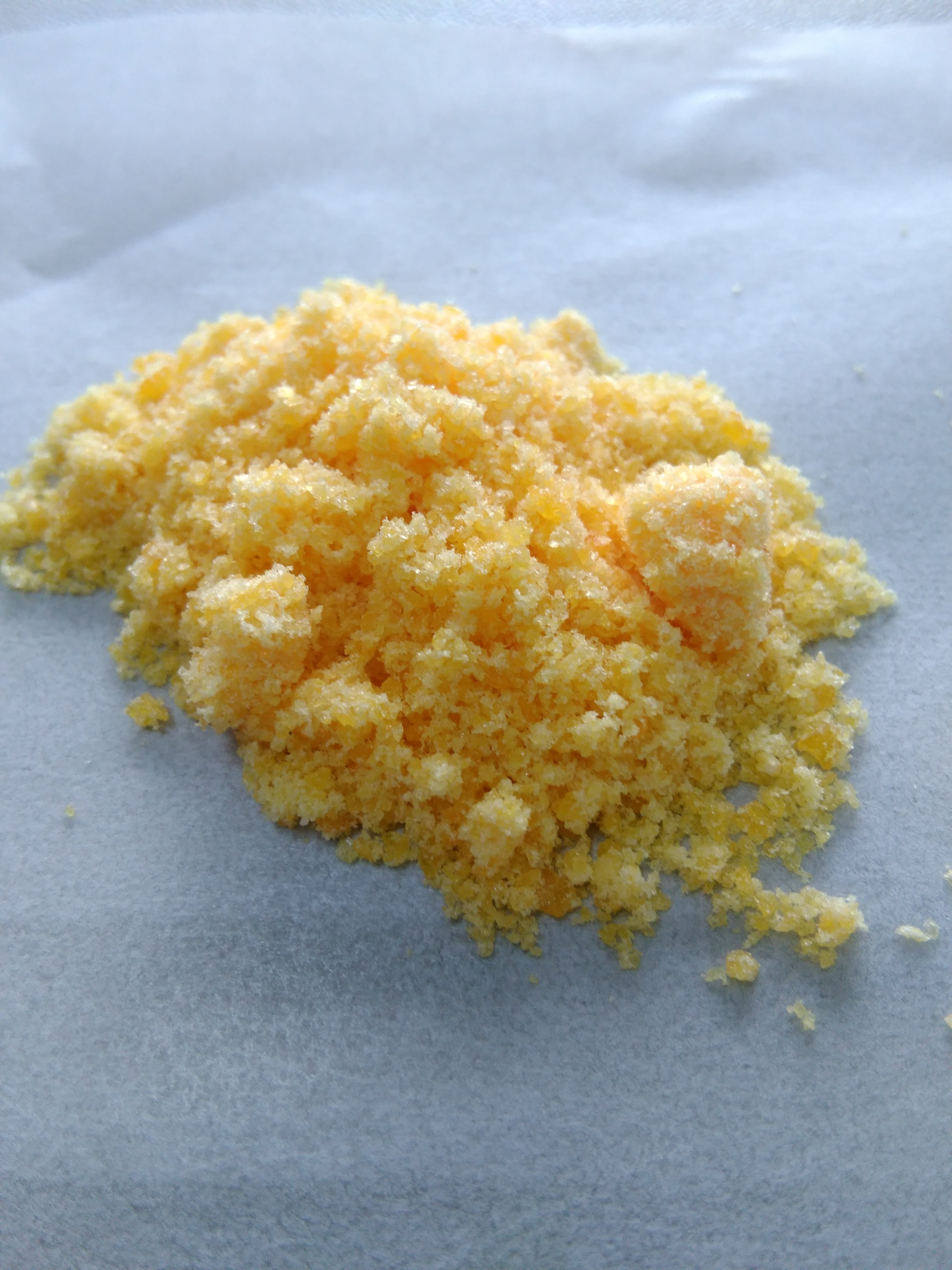
Potassium tetracyanonickelate(II) solid.

The cyanonickelates are a class of chemical compound containing anions consisting of nickel atoms, and cyanide groups. The most important of these are the tetracyanonickelates containing four cyanide groups per nickel. The tetracyanonickelates contain the [Ni(CN)_{4}]^{2−} anion. This can exist in solution or in solid salts. The ion has cyanide groups arranged in a square around the central nickel ion. The symmetry of the ion is D_{4h}. The distance from the nickel atom to the carbon is 1.87 Å, and the carbon-nitrogen distance is 1.16 Å. In their crystals, the tetracyanonickelate(II) anions are often arranged in a columnar structure (e.g. in K_{2}[Ni(CN)_{4}]). Tetracyanonickelate(II) can be oxidised electrochemically in solution to yield tetracyanonickelate(III) [Ni(CN)_{4}]^{−}. [Ni(CN)_{4}]^{−} is unstable and Ni(III) oxidises the cyanide to cyanate OCN^{−}. Tetracyanonickelate(III) can add two more cyanide groups to form hexacyanonickelate(III).

In combination with alkyldiamines, and other metal ions, tetracyanonickelate ions can form cage structure that can accommodate organic molecules. This is a Hofmann-diam-type clathrate.

If the cation is a very strong reducing agent, such as Yb^{2+}, [Ni(CN)_{4}]^{2−} can be reduced to [Ni_{2}(CN)_{6}]^{4−} where nickel atom is in the +1 oxidation state.

formula	name	Ni Ox	structure	Remarks	references
Na_{2}[Ni(CN)_{4}]·3H_{2}O	disodium tetracyanonickelate(II)	2	triclinic a = 7.392 Å, b = 8.895 Å, c = 15.11 Å, α = 89.12, β= 87.46, γ = 84.54° Z=4 V=988 Å^{3} FW=262.81	orange; Ni(CN)_{4} planes parallel	
K_{2}[Ni(CN)_{4}]·H_{2}O	potassium tetracyanonickelate(II)	2	monoclinic	orange-red; dehydrate at 110°	
K_{2}[Ni(CN)_{4}]	Potassium tetracyanonickelate	2	monoclinic a=4.294 Å, b=7.680 Å, c=13.02 Å, β=87°16′	orange-yellow; CN forms a square around Ni	
Ca[Ni(CN)_{4}]·5H_{2}O	calcium tetracyanonickelate	2	orthorhombic Pcab a=18.18 Å, b=18.86 Å, c=6.774 Å, Z=8, V=2195 Å^{3}, density=1.774	CN forms distorted square around Ni; yellow when light polarized in elongation direction, colourless ⊥	
Co·2H_{2}O[Ni(CN)_{4}]·4H_{2}O	diaquacobalt tetracyanonickelate tetrahydrate	2	orthorhombic a=12.178 Å, b=13.885 Å, c=7.143 Å, V=1207.8 Z=4	orange MW=329.82	
Ni(NH_{3})_{2}[Ni(CN)_{4}]·C_{6}H_{6}	Hofmann clathrate	2/2		benzene can be replaced by some other aromatic hydrocarbons; octahedral nickel can be replaced by Mn, Fe, Co, Cu, Zn or Cd. The square planar nickel can be replaced by Pd or Pt. Ammonia can be replaced by diamines and amines.	
Rb_{2}[Ni(CN)_{4}]·H_{2}O	rubidium tetracyanonickelate(II)	2	triclinic P1̅ a=8.602 Å, b=9.693 Å, c=12.006 Å, α = 92.621°, β= 94.263°, γ =111.79° V=924.0 Å^{3}	orange needles; Ni(CN)_{4} planes parallel; water in 5% excess	
Sr[Ni(CN)_{4}]·5H_{2}O	strontium tetracyanonickelate(II)	2	monoclinic C2/m, a=10.356 Å, b=15.272 Å, c=7.133 Å, α=98.55°, V=1115.6 Å^{3}	orange; Ni(CN)_{4} planes parallel	
Cd·2H_{2}O[Ni(CN)_{4}]·4H_{2}O	diaquacadmium tetracyanonickelate tetrahydrate	2	orthorhombic Pnma, a = 12.393 Å, b = 14.278 Å, c = 7.427 Å, Z = 4, V=1314 Å^{3}, density=1.937	MW=383.27	
Cs_{2}[Ni(CN)_{4}]·1.05H_{2}O	cesium tetracyanonickelate(II)	2	hexagonal, P61, a = 9.526 Å, c = 19.043 Å, V = 1496.5 Å^{3} Z=6	golden yellow; Ni(CN)_{4} planes arranged in a spiral	
CsKNi(CN)_{4}	cesium potassium tetracyanonickelate	2	triclinic a= 7.421 Å, b= 8.626 Å, c= 9.364 Å, α= 60.64°,β= 70.88°, y= 70.88°, and Z= 2. den=2.55	orange	
Ba[Ni(CN)_{4}]·4H_{2}O	barium tetracyanonickelate(II)	2	monoclinic	red	
(Dimethylformamide)_{4}EuNi(CN)_{4}	europium(II) tetracyanonickelate	2	triclinic P1̄, a=8.902Å, b=10.947Å, c = 12.464Å, α = 82.99°, β = 86.86°, γ = 84.92°, Z = 2		
Tl_{2}[Ni(CN)_{4}]·1.05H_{2}O	thallium(I) tetracyanonickelate	2	monoclinic a=6.154 b=7.282 c=9.396 β=104.29 V=408.0 Z=2 density=4.652	bright yellow orange; chains of TlNi	
(UO_{2})_{2}(dmso)_{4}(OH)_{2}[Ni(CN)_{4}]		2	monoclinic C2/c a=21.522 Å, b=10.2531 Å, c=13.3170 Å, β=111.943° V=2725.8 Å	yellow	
K_{4}[(CN)_{3}Ni-Ni(CN)_{3}]	potassium hexacyanodinickelate(I)	1			"Bellucci's salt"
