= Ferrocyanide =

Anion in which a Fe2+ ion is complexed by 6 CN– ions

Ferrocyanide ion

Identifiers
CAS Number	13408-63-4
3D model (JSmol)	Interactive image
ChEBI	CHEBI:5032
ChemSpider	10446887
KEGG	C01913
PubChem CID	9552077
UNII	FLX0VIC39Y
CompTox Dashboard (EPA)	DTXSID0065436
- InChI: InChI=1S/6CN.Fe/c6*1-2;/q6*-1;+2 Key: UETZVSHORCDDTH-UHFFFAOYSA-N
- SMILES: N#C[Fe-2](C#N)(C#N)(C#N)(C#N)C#N

Properties
Chemical formula	C_{6}FeN_{6}^{4−}
Molar mass	211.955 g·mol^{−1}

Related compounds
Related compounds	Ferricyanide
- Except where otherwise noted, data are given for materials in their standard state (at 25 °C [77 °F], 100 kPa). Infobox references

Ferrocyanide is the anion [Fe(CN)_{6}]^{4−}. Salts of this coordination complex give yellow solutions. It is usually available as the salt potassium ferrocyanide, which has the formula K_{4}Fe(CN)_{6}. [Fe(CN)_{6}]^{4−} is a diamagnetic species, featuring low-spin iron(II) center in an octahedral ligand environment. Although many salts of cyanide are highly toxic, ferro- and ferricyanides are less toxic because they tend not to release free cyanide. It is of commercial interest as a precursor to the pigment Prussian blue and, as its potassium salt, an anticaking agent.

== Reactions ==
Treatment of ferrocyanide with ferric-containing salts gives the intensely coloured pigment Prussian blue (sometimes called ferric ferrocyanide and ferrous ferricyanide).

Ferrocyanide can be reversibly oxidized by one electron, giving ferricyanide:

[Fe(CN)_{6}]^{4−} ⇌ [Fe(CN)_{6}]^{3−} + e^{−}

This conversion can be followed spectroscopically at 420 nm, since ferrocyanide has negligible absorption at this wavelength while ferricyanide has an extinction coefficient of 1040 M^{−1} cm^{−1}.

In aqueous solution, ferrocyanide undergoes aquation.

== Applications ==
The dominant use of ferrocyanides is as precursors to the Prussian blue pigments. Sodium ferrocyanide is a common anti-caking agent. Specialized applications involves their use as precipitating agents for production of citric acid and wine.

=== Research ===
Ferrocyanide and its oxidized product ferricyanide cannot freely pass through the plasma membrane. For this reason ferrocyanide has been used as a probe of extracellular electron acceptor in the study of redox reactions in cells. Ferricyanide is consumed in the process, thus any increase in ferrocyanide can be attributed to secretions of reductants or transplasma membrane electron transport activity.

Nickel ferrocyanide (Ni_{2}Fe(CN)_{6}) is also used as catalyst in electro-oxidation (anodic oxidation) of urea. Aspirational applications range from hydrogen production for cleaner energy with lower CO_{2} emission to wastewater treatment.

Ferrocyanide is also studied as an electrolyte in flow batteries.

== Nomenclature ==
According to the recommendations of IUPAC, ferrocyanide should be called "hexacyanidoferrate(II)". Cyanides as a chemical class were named because they were discovered in ferrocyanide. Ferrocyanide in turn was named in Latin to mean "blue substance with iron." The dye Prussian blue had been first made in the early 18th century. The word "cyanide" used in the name is from κύανος kyanos, Greek for "(dark) blue."

== Gallery ==
Common ferrocyanide salts

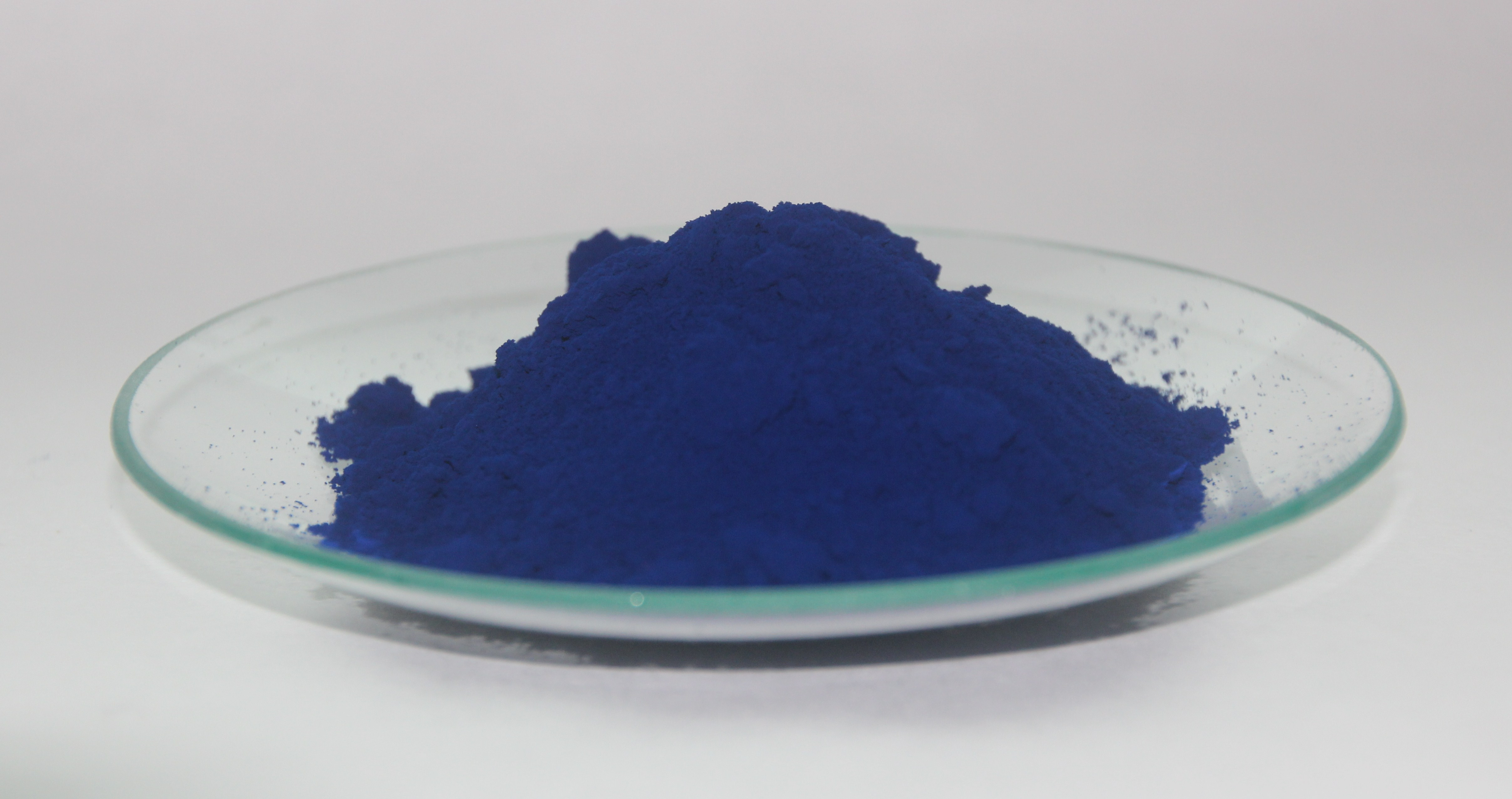
Fe_{4}[Fe(CN)_{6}]_{3}

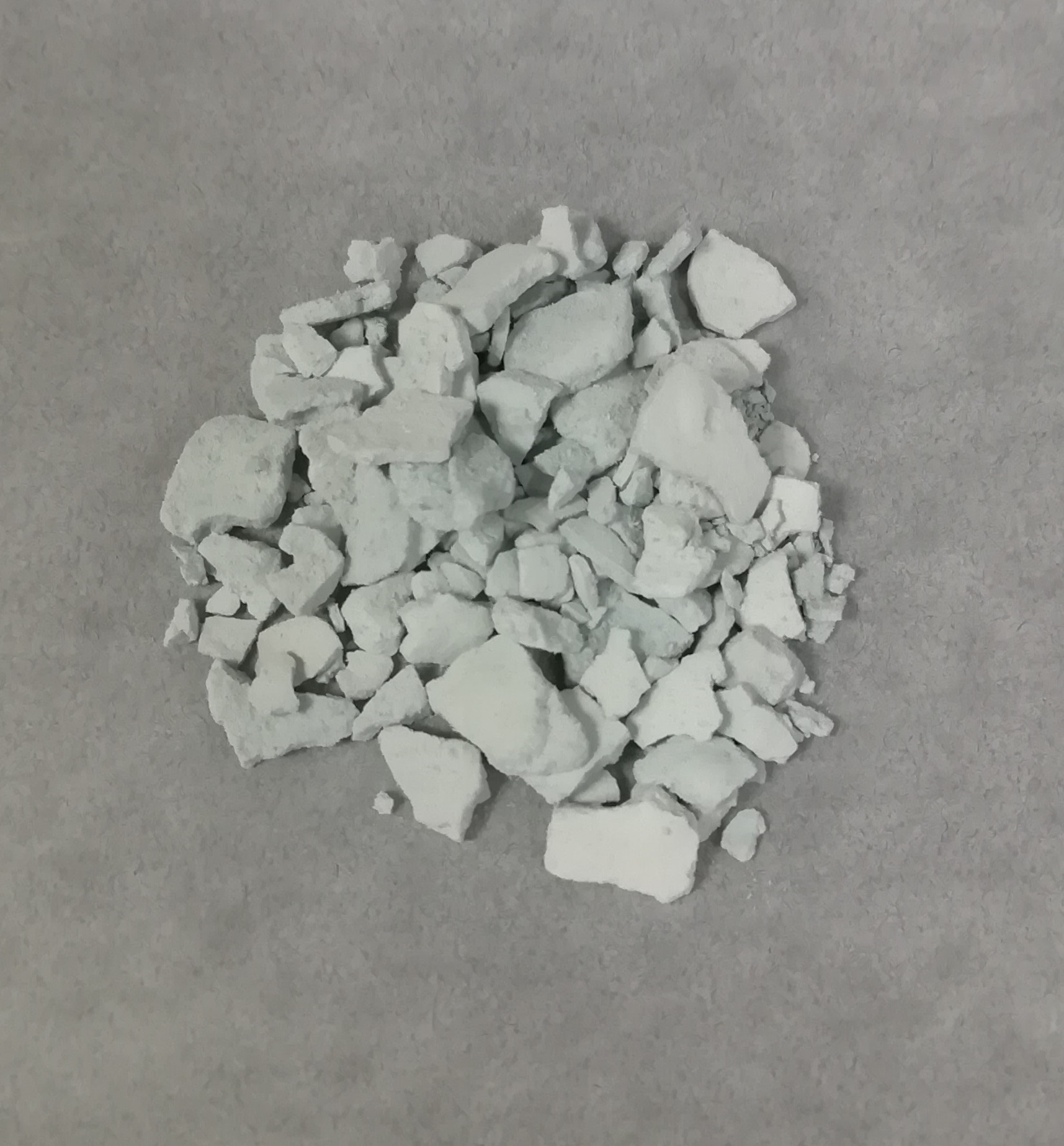
Ag_{4}Fe(CN)_{6}

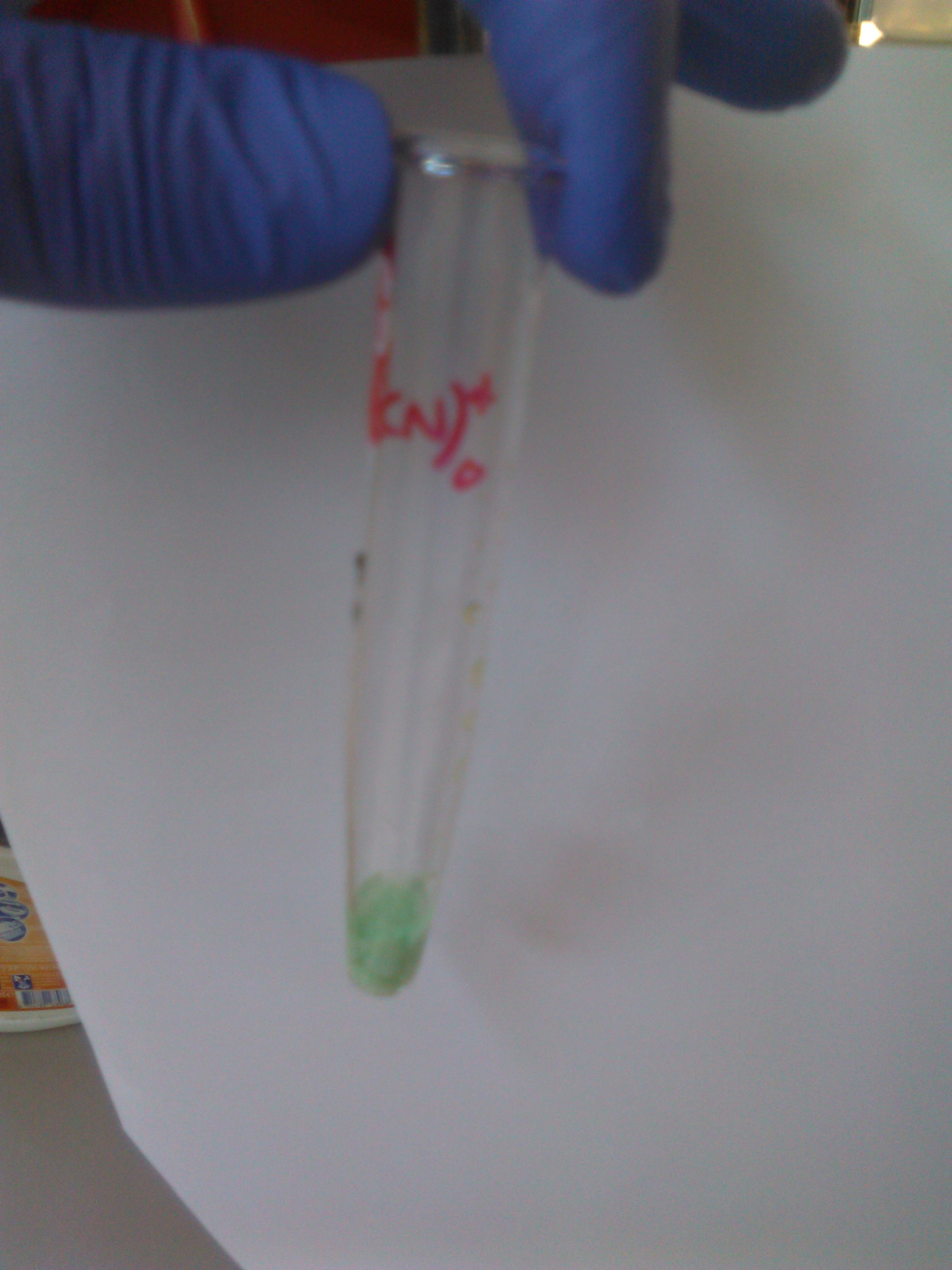
Ni_{4}[Fe(CN)_{6}]_{2}

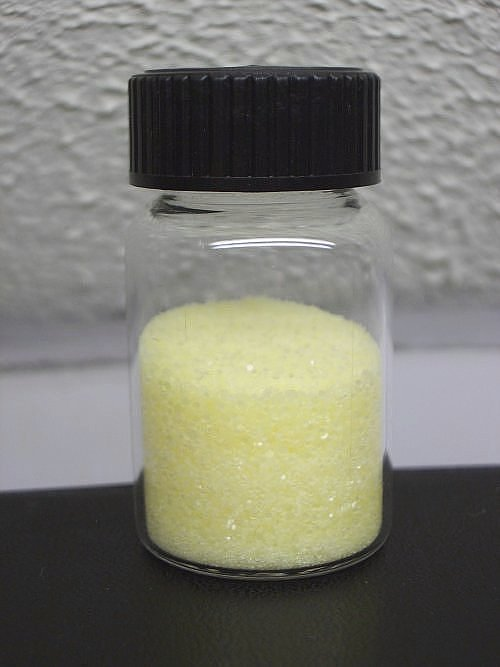
K_{4}[Fe(CN)_{6}]

== See also ==
- Ferricyanide
- Blue billy – Prussian blue deposit formed in soils contaminated by effluents of chemical industry
- Perls' Prussian blue - a histology stain
- Potassium ferrocyanide
- Sodium ferrocyanide
