= Ammonium hexacyanoferrate(II) =

Names
- IUPAC name Ammonium hexacyanoferrate(II)
- Other names: Ammonium ferrocyanide; Tetraammonium ferrocyanide; Tetraammonium hexacyanidoferrate

Identifiers
CAS Number	14481-29-9
3D model (JSmol)	Interactive image
ChEBI	CHEBI:30067
ChemSpider	19957399
ECHA InfoCard	100.034.963
EC Number	38-476-9
Gmelin Reference	46775
PubChem CID	26708
UNII	GHD63ZGL2L
CompTox Dashboard (EPA)	DTXSID1051725
- InChI: InChI=1S/6CN.Fe.4H3N/c6*1-2;;;;;/h;;;;;;;4*1H3/q6*-1;+2;;;;/p+4 Key: ZXQVPEBHZMCRMC-UHFFFAOYSA-R
- SMILES: [C-]#N.[C-]#N.[C-]#N.[C-]#N.[C-]#N.[C-]#N.[NH4+].[NH4+].[NH4+].[NH4+].[Fe+2]

Properties
Chemical formula	C_{6}H_{16}FeN_{10}
Molar mass	284.109 g·mol^{−1}
Appearance	green solid
Density	1.423 g/cm^{3}
Solubility in water	soluble
Solubility	insoluble in ethanol

Structure
Crystal structure	cubic (sesquihydrate)
Space group	Ia3̅d (No. 230)
Lattice constant	a = 18.261 Å α = 90°, β = 90°, γ = 90°
Formula units (Z)	16 units per cell

Hazards
- GHS labelling
Pictograms	(GHS07: Exclamation mark)
Signal word	Warning
Hazard statements	H302, H312, H332
Precautionary statements	P261, P264, P270, P271, P280, P301+P317, P302+P352, P304+P340, P317, P321, P330, P362+P364, P501
- Except where otherwise noted, data are given for materials in their standard state (at 25 °C [77 °F], 100 kPa). Infobox references

Ammonium hexacyanoferrate(II) is an inorganic compound with the chemical formula (NH_{4})_{4}[Fe(CN)_{6}]. A hygroscopic, yellowish-green monohydrate as well as a trihydrate exist. A sesquihydrate has been characterized. The compound loses NH_{3} on exposure to air and light.

== Synthesis ==
Ammonium hexacyanoferrate(II) can be prepared by the neutralization of ferrocyanic acid with ammonia solution followed by salting with ethanol:

H_{4}Fe(CN)_{6} + 4NH_{3} → (NH_{4})_{4}[Fe(CN)_{6}]

== Uses ==
It is of research interest as a catholyte in flow batteries.

== Reactions ==
The compound decomposes with the sequential formation of (NH_{4})_{3}[Fe^{III}(CN)_{6}], (NH_{4})_{3}[Fe^{II}(CN)_{5}], FeIII
4 [Fe^{II}(CN)_{6}]_{3} (Prussian blue), and finally Fe_{2}O_{3}. Prussian blue nanoparticles as well as amorphous Fe_{2}O_{3} nanoparticles can be prepared using this method.

== Related compounds ==
Double salts such as ammonium barium hexacyanoferrate(II) trihydrate (Ba(NH_{4})_{2}[Fe(CN)_{6}]·3H_{2}O) have been characterized.
