= Downes (surname) =

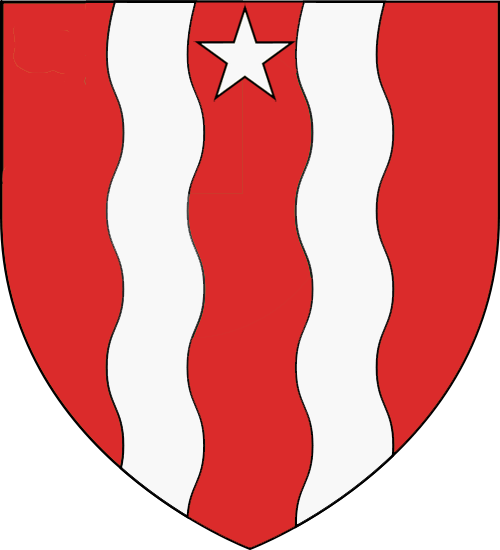
Downes.

Downes (Irish: Ó Dubháin), is a surname of Irish and English origin, and may refer to:

- Aaron Downes (born 1985), Australian footballer
- Aidan Downes (born 1988), Irish footballer
- Alexander Downes (1868–1950), Australian-born rugby player and cricketer who relocated to New Zealand
- Andrew Downes (scholar) (c. 1549–1628), English classical scholar
- Andrew Downes (composer) (1950–2023), British classical composer
- Arthur Downes (1883–1956), Scottish sailor who competed at the 1908 Summer Olympics
- Arthur Downes (police officer) (1895–1984), British-born New Zealand soldier, clerk, salesman and policeman
- Austin Downes (1905–1979), American football player at the University of Georgia
- Bessie Downes (1860–1920) Elizabeth (Bessie) Downes, botanical artist, Southport, UK
- Bob Downes (born 1937), English avant-garde jazz flautist and saxophonist
- Bobby Downes (footballer) (born 1949), English footballer
- Bobby Downes (film producer) (born 1967), American movie producer, elder brother of Kevin Downes
- Disappearance of Charlene Downes (1989–2003), English suspected murder victim
- Danny Downes (born 1986), American mixed martial artist
- David Downes (disambiguation), multiple people
- Doris Downes (born 1961), American botanical artist, painter of natural history, and writer
- Edward Downes (1911–2001), American musicologist, critic and quizmaster for the Metropolitan Opera
- Sir Edward Downes (1924–2009), British conductor
- Flynn Downes (born 1999), English footballer
- Francis Downes (1606–48), English politician
- Fred Downes (1855–1917), Australian politician
- Garry Downes (born 1944), Australian judge
- Geoff Downes (born 1952), English rock songwriter, record producer, and musician
- Henry Downes (disambiguation), multiple people (including Harry)
- John Downes (disambiguation), multiple people
- Johnny Haddon Downes (1920–2004), English Royal Air Force flyer and television producer
- Joseph M. Downes (before 1946 – 1993), American politician in Massachusetts
- Julia Downes (born before 1982), songwriter, musician and producer
- Katie Downes (born 1984), English glamour model
- Kerry Downes (1930–2019), English architectural historian, son of Ralph Downes
- Kevin Downes (born 1972), American actor, writer, producer and director, younger brother of Bobby Barnes
- Kevin Downes (hurler) (born 1991), Irish hurler
- Kit Downes (born before 2007), British jazz pianist
- Kyle Downes (born 1983), Canadian-American actor
- Lara Downes, American classical pianist and cultural activist
- Larry Downes (born before 1998), American internet industry analyst and author on business strategies and information technology
- Lawrence Downes (born before 1986), American journalist
- Lorraine Downes (born 1964), New Zealand dancer and beauty queen
- Major Downes (1834–1923), British army officer
- Mark Downes (born 1974), English cricketer
- Melissa Downes (born 1971), Australian broadcast journalist
- Mike Downes (born 1979), American telecom entrepreneur and iconic world traveler
- Miranda Downes (died 1985), Australian screenwriter
- Olin Downes (1886–1955), American classical music critic
- P. G. Downes (AKA Spike Downes, 1909–59), American school teacher, author and explorer
- Paul Downes (born before 1968), English folk guitarist, singer and composer
- Percy Downes (1905–89), English footballer
- Rackstraw Downes (born 1939), British-born realist painter and author
- Ralph Downes (1904–93), English organist, father of Kerry Downes
- Rebecca Downes, English blues rock singer, guitarist, songwriter and vocal coach
- Richard Downes (journalist) (active from 1985), Irish broadcaster and journalist
- Robin Atkin Downes (born 1978), English screen and voice actor
- Roger Downes (before 1601 – 1638), English lawyer and politician
- Rupert Downes (1885–1945), Australian soldier, general, surgeon and historian
- Sean Downes ( 1962–1984), Irish republican and plastic bullet victim
- Stephen Downes (disambiguation), multiple people (including Steve and Steven)
- Terry Downes (1936–2017), British professional boxer
- Thomas William Downes (1868–1938), New Zealand historian, ethnologist and river works supervisor
- Tony Downes (active 2012), British academic lawyer
- Tyrone Downes (born 1957), Barbadian professional boxer
- Wally Downes (born 1961), English football player, manager and coach
- Willard A. Downes (1908–2000), American artist and illustrator
- William Downes (disambiguation), multiple people

== See also ==
- Baron Downes, a former title in the peerage of Ireland
- Downes v. Bidwell, a U.S. Supreme Court case of 1901
- Mollie Panter-Downes (1906–97), American novelist and newspaper columnist
- Molly Smitten-Downes (born 1987), British singer-songwriter
- Richard Downes Jackson (1777–1845), English-born Canadian administrator
- William Downes Griffith (1829–1908), Attorney General of Cape Colony 1866–72
- Downs (surname)
- Down (surname)
