= Downs (surname) =

Downs is a surname of Old English origin. Notable people with the surname include:

- Alexander Downs (1876–1924), Scottish cricketer
- Annie F. Downs (born 1980), American author
- Anthony Downs (1930–2021), American economist
- Barbara Downs (born 1954), American tennis player
- Bertis Downs IV (born 1956), American entertainment lawyer
- Bill Downs (1914–1978), American war correspondent
- Caleb Downs (born 2004), American football player
- Carolyn Downs (activist) (1953–1978), American Black Panther Party activist
- Carolyn Downs (born 1960), British public servant
- Cathy Downs (1924–1976), American actress
- C. H. Downs (1911–1985), American lawyer and politician
- Charles E. Downs (1898–1967), American politician
- Christopher Downs (born 1974), American boxer
- Cornelia Mitchell Downs (1892–1987), American microbiologist
- Damion Downs (born 2004), soccer player
- Dave Downs (born 1952), American baseball player
- Deidre Downs (born 1980), American physician and winner of Miss America 2005
- Devante Downs (born 1995), American football player
- Diane Downs (born 1955), American murderer
- Donald Downs (born 1948), American professor
- Dorothea Downs (1917–1968), American baseball player
- Ephraim Downs (1787–1860), American clockmaker
- Ethan Downs (born 2002), American football player
- George W. Downs (physicist) (fl. 1946), American businessman
- George W. Downs (political scientist) (1946–2015), American political scientist
- Georgina Downs, British journalist
- Greg Downs (born 1958), English footballer
- Hugh Downs (1921–2020), American broadcaster
- Jack Downs (born 1995), English rugby player
- James Cloyd Downs (1885–1957) inventor of the Downs cell for electrochemical production of sodium
- Jason Downs (born 1973), American singer
- Jeanne Downs (born 1967), British television presenter
- Jeter Downs (born 1998), American baseball player
- Johnny Downs (1913–1994), American actor
- Joseph Downs (1895–1954), American curator
- Josh Downs (born 2001), American football player
- Lila Downs (born 1968), Mexican-American singer
- Matt Downs (born 1984), American baseball player
- Marion Downs (1914–2014), American audiologist
- Nicholas Downs (born 1976), American actor
- Philip Downs (1928–2014), English musicologist
- Riele Downs (born 2001), Canadian actress
- Sally Ward Lawrence Hunt Armstrong Downs (1827–1896), American socialite
- Sarah Corson Downs (1822–1891), American temperance activist
- Sarah Elizabeth Forbush Downs (1843–1926), American novelist
- Samara Downs, British ballerina
- Scott Downs (born 1976), American baseball player
- Solomon W. Downs (1801–1854), American politician
- Tara Downs, Canadian artist
- Thomas Nelson Downs (1867–1938), American magician
- Wilbur Downs (1913–1991), American naturalist and virologist
- William Ernest Downs Jr. (1967–2006), American convicted child killer

== See also ==
- Down (surname)
