= Down (surname) =

Down is an English surname. Notable people with the surname include:

- Alastair Down (1956–2024), British horse racing journalist and broadcaster
- Alec Down (1914–1995), British archaeologist
- Alisen Down (born 1976), Canadian actress
- Angela Down (born 1946), English actress
- Bill Down (1934–2025), British Anglican bishop
- Billy Down (1898–1977), English footballer
- Blaine Down (born 1982), Canadian ice hockey player
- Dru Down (born 1969), American rapper and actor
- Elissa Down, Australian filmmaker
- Ernest Down (1902–1980), British Army officer
- J.H. Down, English cricketer
- James Down (born 1987), British rugby union player
- John Langdon Down (1828–1896), British physician
- John Thornton Down (1842–1866), British Army officer
- Lesley-Anne Down (born 1954), English actress, model, and singer
- Linda Down, American runner with cerebral palsy
- Percy Down (1883–1954), English rugby union player
- Philip Down (born 1953), Australian-English priest
- Rick Down (1950–2019), American baseball coach

== See also ==
- Downs (surname)
- Downes (surname)
- Downing (surname)
- Down (disambiguation)
- Downs (disambiguation)
