= Downs =

Downland, Downs, or The Downs may refer to:

== Places ==
=== Topography ===
In the 'hill' context, the word 'down' derives from Celtic (Gaelic or Welsh) dun "hill, hill fort".

- Downland, a geographical feature

=== Australia ===
- Darling Downs, Queensland, a farming region on the western slopes of the Great Dividing Range in southern Queensland

=== Europe ===
- The Downs (ship anchorage), the sea area between Goodwin Sands and the East Kent coast
- The Downs, Bristol, a public open space in Bristol, England
- North Downs, England, the counterpart of the South Downs. The two are often referred to as a collective term
- South Downs, England, the counterpart of the North Downs
- The Downs, a large grassy area on the University of Nottingham's University Park Campus
- The Downs, White Horse Hills, England
- Downs (townland, County Westmeath), a townland in Taghmon civil parish, barony of Corkaree, County Westmeath, Ireland
- North Wessex Downs, England

=== North America ===
- Downs, Illinois, a village in the United States
- Downs, Kansas, a small city in the United States
- The Downs, a hilly peninsula in Ferryland, Newfoundland and Labrador, Canada

== Other ==
- Downs (surname)
- Downs cell, a vessel used for manufacturing pure sodium
- Down's syndrome, a genetic disorder

== See also ==
- The Downs School (disambiguation)
- Downs Station, a former formation of the Royal Navy
- Down (disambiguation)
- Downes (disambiguation)
