= David Downes =

David Downes may refer to:

- David Downes (sociologist) (born before 1966), British sociologist and criminologist
- David Downes (New Zealand composer) (born 1967), noted for dance-inspired music
- David Downes (Irish composer) (born 1975), co-founder and musical director of Celtic Woman

== See also ==
- Dave Downs (born 1952), baseball player
- Downes (surname)
