= Downes =

Downes may refer to:

- Downes Sports F.C., the former name of Hinckley Downes F.C.
- Downes v. Bidwell, a US Supreme Court case
- Downes (surname), people with the surname Downes
- USS Downes, several United States Navy ships

== See also ==
- Downs (disambiguation)
