= William Downs =

William Downs may refer to:

- William Downs (artist), American artist
- William Missouri Downs, American comedy writer and playwright
- William B. Downs, American orthodontist
- Bill Downs, American broadcast journalist and war correspondent

== See also ==
- William Downes (disambiguation)
