= Bob Wieland =

American athlete and Vietnam War veteran

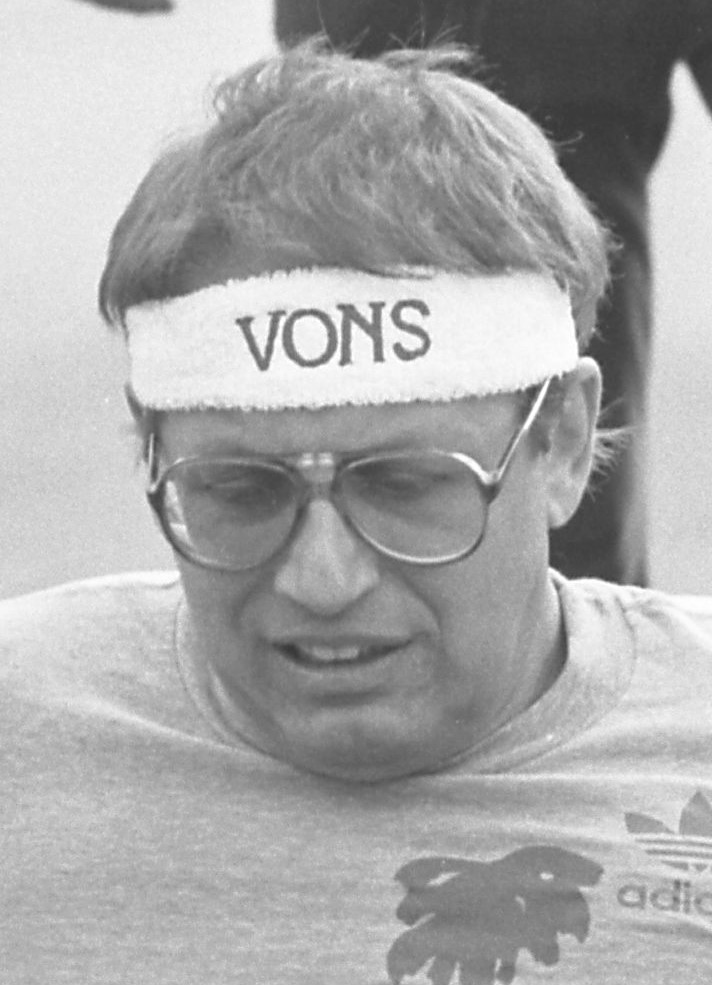
- Wieland in 1987
- Born: Greenfield, Wisconsin
- Education: University of Wisconsin; California State University, Los Angeles
- Known for: Completing marathons with no legs or wheelchair

Bob Wieland is a Vietnam War veteran who lost his legs to a mortar mine in 1969. After recovering from his injuries he was inspired to become a marathon participant. Over his lifetime he has finished many marathons, often taking multiple days to finish. He is the only double amputee to finish the difficult Kona, Hawaii Ironman race without a wheelchair. He "ran" across America on his hands, taking three years, eight months, and six days to travel from coast to coast.

== Early life ==
Growing up in Wisconsin, Wieland attended the University of Wisconsin. A talented baseball player, he was negotiating a deal with the Philadelphia Phillies when he decided to join the Army as a combat medic.

== Vietnam ==
In Vietnam in June 1969, his squad walked into a mine field. When a member of his unit stepped on a booby-trapped mortar, Wieland rushed to give first aid but he, too, stepped on an 82mm buried mortar, a round designed to destroy tanks. It severely damaged his legs; they had to be amputated above the knee. In a letter to his parents after his accident, he wrote:

June 14, 1969

Dear Mom and Dad.

I'm in the hospital. Everything is going to be O.K. The people here are taking good care of me.

Love, Bob.

P.S. I think I lost my legs.

Wieland likes to say of that day, "My legs went one direction, my life another."

== Recovery and NFL career ==
After recovering from his injuries, he enrolled at California State University, Los Angeles majoring in education. After college, he joined the Green Bay Packers as a strength coach.

== Marathons ==
In November 1986 he completed the New York City Marathon, taking four days to complete the 26 miles (42 km) race. He "ran" across America on his hands, taking three years, eight months, and six days to travel from coast to coast and raise money for Vietnam war veterans. In 1988 at 41, he finished the Los Angeles Marathon, taking 74.5 hours to finish the 26.2 miles (42.2 km) race. He started the race a day earlier than everyone else and finished two days after the last runner had crossed the finish line.

Wieland was a guest on 100 Huntley Street.

On August 23, 2012, Wieland announced his plans for the Celebrate America Tour starting in January 2013. Over the next 5 years, his plans are to visit all 50 States in the US, extending a challenge to do a measure more and inspire others. He will be speaking at conventions, corporate meetings, military bases, universities, high schools and churches.

== Actor ==
In the 1988–1990 TV series Sonny Spoon, Wieland played the character of Johnny Skates.

== See also ==
- Linda Down
- Terry Fox

== Sources ==
- Rote, Kyle; Pettigrew, Joe (2009). Living Life in the Zone: A 40-Day Spiritual Gameplan for Men. Thomas Nelson Inc. ISBN 978-0-8499-4652-3.
- "Bob Wieland finishes LA Marathon hard way". Ocala Star-Banner. March 10, 1988. p. 2.
- "SCOUTING; Fast Forward In Reverse". The New York Times. November 11, 1986.
- Wieland, Bob (March 9, 2003). "CNN Sunday". CNN.
