= Castner process =

Process for manufacturing sodium metal

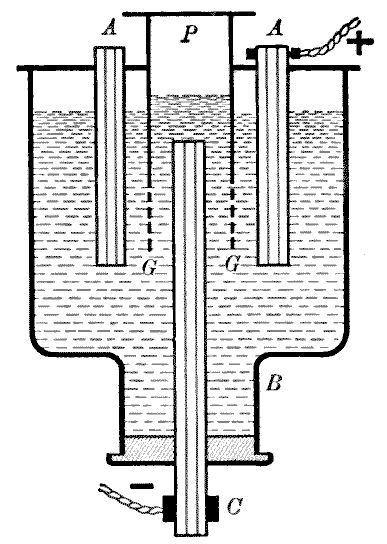
Diagram of Castner process apparatus

The Castner process is a process for manufacturing sodium metal by electrolysis of molten sodium hydroxide at approximately 330 °C. Below that temperature, the melt would solidify; above that temperature, the molten sodium would start to dissolve in the melt.

== History ==
The Castner process for production of sodium metal was introduced in 1888 by Hamilton Castner. At that time (prior to the introduction in the same year of the Hall-Héroult process) the primary use for sodium metal was as a reducing agent to produce aluminium from its purified ores. The Castner process reduced the cost of producing sodium in comparison to the old method of reducing sodium carbonate at high temperature using carbon. This in turn reduced the cost of producing aluminium, although the reduction-by-sodium method still could not compete with Hall-Héroult. The Castner process continued nevertheless due to Castner's finding new markets for sodium. In 1926, the Downs cell replaced the Castner process.

External videos
- The Castner Sodium Process (1952)

== Process details ==
The diagram shows a ceramic crucible with a steel cylinder suspended within. Both cathode (C) and anode (A) are made of iron or nickel. The temperature is cooler at the bottom and hotter at the top so that the sodium hydroxide is solid in the neck (B) and liquid in the body of the vessel. Sodium metal forms at the cathode but is less dense than the fused sodium hydroxide electrolyte. Wire gauze (G) confines the sodium metal to accumulating at the top of the collection device (P).

The cathode reaction is:

2 Na^{+} + 2 e^{−} → 2 Na

The anode reaction is:

4 OH^{−} → O_{2} + 2 H_{2}O + 4 e^{−}

Despite the elevated temperature, some of the water produced remains dissolved in the electrolyte. This water diffuses throughout the electrolyte and results in the reverse reaction taking place on the electrolyzed sodium metal:

2 Na + 2 H_{2}O → H_{2} + 2 Na^{+} + 2 OH^{−}

with the hydrogen gas also accumulating at (P). This, of course, reduces the efficiency of the process.

== See also ==
- Downs cell
