= Sonny Spoon =

- Genre: Crime drama
- Created by: Michael Daly; Dinah Prince; Stephen J. Cannell; Randall Wallace
- Starring: Mario Van Peebles; Melvin Van Peebles; Jordana Capra
- Country of origin: United States
- Original language: English
- No. of seasons: 2
- No. of episodes: 15

Production
- Running time: 48 minutes
- Production companies: Stephen J. Cannell Productions; NBC Productions

Original release
- Network: NBC
- Release: February 12 – December 16, 1988

Sonny Spoon is an American crime drama television series that aired on NBC television network from February 12 to December 16, 1988. The series was created by Michael Daly, Dinah Prince, Stephen J. Cannell, and Randall Wallace, and was a joint production of Stephen J. Cannell Productions in association with NBC Productions.

== Overview ==
Sonny Spoon stars Mario Van Peebles as Sonny, a hip, black private investigator who uses his street smarts and "cool" persona to solve crimes. He often assists, and is assisted by, Carolyn Gilder (Terry Donahoe), an attractive assistant district attorney. Additionally, Sonny was a master of disguises, and might spend part of any given episode dressed as a clergyman, an Arab tourist, or an old lady. He used his many connections on the streets and relationships with friends and informants (who were apparently attracted to him mostly by his vibrant personality, as he had little cash to share with them) to further his ends, and also the insights of his father, Mel, a bar owner (played by Melvin Van Peebles, Mario's real-life father).

== Cast ==
- Mario Van Peebles as Sonny Spoon
- Melvin Van Peebles as Mel Spoon
- Terry Donahoe as Carolyn Gilder
- Jordana Capra as Monique
- Bob Wieland as Johnny Skates
- Larry Friel as Det. Bartlett

== Episodes ==
=== Series overview ===
Season	Episodes	Originally released	
Season	Episodes	First released	Last released
1	7	February 12, 1988	April 12, 1988
2	8	October 7, 1988	December 16, 1988

=== Season 1 (1988) ===
No. overall	No. in season	Title	Directed by	Written by	Original release date	Rating/share (households)
1	1	"Sam's Private Eye"	Corey Allen	Unknown	February 12, 1988	12.0/21
2	2	"Wizard of Odds"	Rob Bowman	Stephen J. Cannell	February 19, 1988	11.3/19
3	3	"Crimes Below the Waist"	Robert Iscove	Story by : Stephen J. Cannell & Randall Wallace & Michael Daly & Dinah Prince; Teleplay by : Stephen J. Cannell	February 26, 1988	11.2/20
4	4	"Who's Got Tonsillitis?"	Unknown	Unknown	March 4, 1988	12.3/22
5	5	"Semper Fi"	Alan Cooke	Randall Wallace	March 11, 1988	11.7/21
6	6	"Tough Habit"	Unknown	Unknown	March 18, 1988	12.1/22
7	7	"Too Good to Be True, Too Smart to Get Caught"	Roy Campanella II	Stephen J. Cannell & Randall Wallace	April 12, 1988	11.6/20

=== Season 2 (1988) ===
No. overall	No. in season	Title	Directed by	Written by	Original release date	Viewers (millions)	Rating/share (households)
8	1	"Never Go to Your High School Reunion"	Roy Campanella II	Story by : Stephen J. Cannell; Teleplay by : Stephen J. Cannell & Jo Swerling, Jr.	October 7, 1988	15.7	11.3/21
9	2	"Cheap & Chili"	Mario Van Peebles	Randall Wallace	October 14, 1988	13.1	8.8/16
10	3	"Blind Justice"	Dennis Dugan	Jack Bernstein	October 28, 1988	11.7	8.3/15
11	4	"Papa Rozzi"	Randy Roberts	Robert Bielak	November 4, 1988	11.8	8.1/14
12	5	"Ratman Can"	Dick Miller	Randall Wallace	December 2, 1988	12.8	9.0/15
13	6	"Deuces Wild"	Bruce Kessler	Stephen J. Cannell	December 9, 1988	12.9	8.5/14
14	7	"Diamonds Aren't Forever"	Bruce Kessler	Jonathan Glassner	December 16, 1988	14.7	9.2/16
15	8	"The Final Exam"	N/A	N/A	Unaired	N/A	TBA

== Production ==
Sonny Spoon began its run as a mid-season replacement in February 1988, and was renewed for a second season. It did not sustain its early momentum and was canceled in December 1988.

== Broadcast history ==
Season	Time slot (ET)
1987–88	Friday at 10:00 pm
1988–89	Friday at 8:00 pm (Episodes 1–4); Friday at 9:00 pm (Episodes 5–7)

== Bilbliography ==
- Tim Brooks and Earle Marsh, The Complete Directory to Prime Time Network and Cable TV Shows 1946–Present, Ninth edition (New York: Ballantine Books, 2007) ISBN 978-0-345-49773-4
