= Time Life Television =

Television division of Time Inc.

- Formerly: Peter M. Robeck & Co. (1958–1969)
- Type: Broadcast; Syndication
- Industry: Entertainment
- Founded: 1958; 68 years ago
- Founder: Peter M. Robeck
- Defunct: 1981; 45 years ago
- Successors: HBO Films; Warner Bros. Domestic Television Distribution
- Headquarters: New York City, New York, U.S.
- Area served: International
- Products: Pay television; Television production; Limited Markets
- Owner: Time Inc. (1969–1981)
- Parent: Time Life Films (Time Life, Inc.)
- Divisions: Home Box Office, Inc.

Time Life Television was a division of Time Life Films and was the television production and distribution arm of Time Inc. With CBS, they led a partnership to export their shows overseas.

== Broadcasting ==
Time Life also owned several radio and TV stations in the United States beginning in the 1950s through to 1983.

By 1970, Time decided to sell its broadcasting operations and to concentrate in cable development.

Time-Life's television stations were sold to McGraw-Hill in early 1972 following FCC approval. Those stations included the following:

- KLZ-TV in Denver, Colorado from 1954 to 1972.
- WFBM-TV in Indianapolis, Indiana from 1957 to 1972.
- WOOD-TV in Grand Rapids, Michigan from 1957 to 1983 when it was sold to LIN Broadcasting.
- KERO-TV in Bakersfield, California from 1964 to 1972.
- KOGO-TV in San Diego, California from 1962 to 1972. Except for WOOD-TV, the E. W. Scripps Company owns the former Time-Life television stations today, following a 2011 deal enabling Scripps to acquire McGraw-Hill's television operations. WOOD-TV is owned today by Nexstar Media Group

Except for KERO-TV, each of these television stations also had AM and FM radio operations; when most of its television stations were sold to McGraw-Hill in 1972, FCC regulations at the time required Time-Life to sell its radio stations to different parties. KERO's then-owners sold off its radio station in 1955, years before Time-Life acquired KERO-TV.

Time Life joined Sterling Manhattan Cable, owned by Charles Dolan and launched Home Box Office in November 1972, which eventually became the largest premium television service in the United States. But due to an early financial loss, Dolan eventually sold his stake of HBO to Time Inc. Time merged with Warner Communications, Inc. in 1989 to form Time Warner, but the Time-Life Television assets were sold to Columbia Pictures Television in 1981, while HBO currently holds of its library.

=== International operations ===
Time Life was also a financial backer for commercial TV broadcasting outside the United States, mostly in Middle and South America. With a joint venture between CBS and Goar Mestre they backed Proartel in Argentina, PROVENTEL in Venezuela (now VTV) and Panamericana Televisión in Peru. In Brazil, they backed Rede Globo, owned by the Marinho family.

Time Life's investments in the United States, Middle and South America in the 1950s and 1960s were largely unsuccessful, due to the stations' owners unhappy with their agreements. The only exception was TV Globo in Brazil, owned by the Marinho family, which was financially backed by Time Life until 1970.

== Television syndication and co-production ==
Time Life Television was most notable as the U.S. distributor of television programming produced by the BBC, including Doctor Who and Monty Python's Flying Circus, taken from Peter M. Robeck & Company. Time-Life's deal with the BBC expired on April 30, 1981. The U.S. rights to Monty Python's Flying Circus would be transferred to Devillier Donegan Enterprises (in a deal that followed the Monty Python troupe gaining ownership of the series months before), while the rest of BBC's output would be spun off to Lionheart Television, a distributor that would later be absorbed by BBC Worldwide.

Non-BBC-related programming distributed or produced by Time Life Television, including most of the Talent Associates library, would later be transferred to HBO; these programs today would be owned by HBO Entertainment and Warner Bros. Pictures Distribution, both units of Warner Bros. Discovery.

In 1973, Time-Life Television co-produced The Ascent of Man with the BBC. In 1980, this collaboration was repeated with The Shock of the New. Later in the 1980s, the two co-produced the BBC Television Shakespeare series.

In 1978, the company produced an adapted and expanded version of the popular People magazine on CBS for a few months. Later that year, it partnered with Telepictures Corporation to distribute its programming to the Middle East.
