= Robert Hughes (critic) =

Australian art critic (1938–2012)

Robert Hughes AO
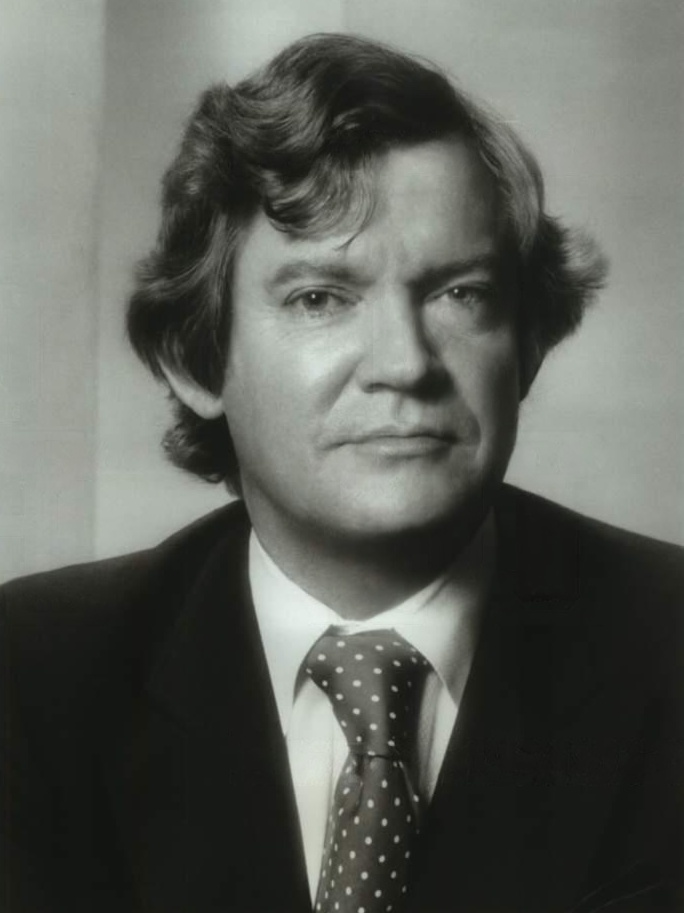
- Hughes in 1978
- Born: Robert Studley Forrest Hughes; 28 July 1938; Sydney, Australia
- Died: 6 August 2012 (aged 74); New York City, U.S.
- Education: Saint Ignatius' College, Riverview; University of Sydney
- Occupations: Art critic; Writer; Television presenter
- Spouses: Danne Emerson (m. 1967; div. 1981) Victoria Whistler (m. 1981; div. 1996) Doris Downes (m. 2001)
- Children: 1
- Parents: Geoffrey Forrest Hughes; Margaret Vidal
- Relatives: Sir Thomas Hughes (grandfather); Tom Hughes (brother); Lucy Turnbull (niece)

Robert Studley Forrest Hughes (28 July 1938 – 6 August 2012) was an Australian art critic, writer and producer of television documentaries. He was described in 1997 by Robert Boynton of The New York Times as "the most famous art critic in the world".

Hughes earned widespread recognition for his book and television series on modern art, The Shock of the New, and for his longstanding position as art critic with TIME magazine. He is also known for his best seller The Fatal Shore (1986), a study of the British convict system in early Australian history. Known for his contentious critiques of art and artists, Hughes was generally conservative in his tastes, although he did not belong to a particular philosophical camp. His writing was noted for its power and elegance.

== Early life ==
Hughes was born in Sydney in 1938. His father and paternal grandfather were lawyers. Hughes's father, Geoffrey Forrest Hughes, was a pilot in the First World War, with later careers as a solicitor and company director. He died from lung cancer when Robert was aged 12. His mother was Margaret Eyre Sealy, née Vidal. His elder brother was Australian politician Tom Hughes, the father of former Sydney Lord Mayor Lucy Turnbull, the wife of former Australian prime minister Malcolm Turnbull. He had another brother, Geoffrey, and a sister, Constance.

Growing up in Rose Bay, Sydney, Hughes was educated at Saint Ignatius' College, Riverview, before studying arts and then architecture at the University of Sydney. At university, he associated with the Sydney "Push" – a group of artists, writers, intellectuals and drinkers. Among the group were Germaine Greer and Clive James.

== Career ==
=== As an art critic ===
Hughes, an aspiring artist and poet, abandoned his university endeavours to become first a cartoonist and then an art critic for the Sydney periodical The Observer, edited by Donald Horne. Hughes was briefly involved in the original Sydney version of Oz magazine and wrote art criticism for Nation and the Sunday Mirror.

In 1961, while still a student, Hughes was caught up in controversy when a number of his classmates demonstrated in a student newspaper article that he had published plagiarised poetry by Terence Tiller and others, and a drawing by Leonard Baskin.

Hughes left Australia for Europe in 1964, living for a time in Italy before settling in London in 1965, where he wrote for The Spectator, The Daily Telegraph, The Times, and The Observer, among others, and contributed to the London version of Oz. In 1970 he was appointed art critic for TIME magazine and moved to New York, where he soon became an influential voice.

In 1966 Hughes published a history of Australian painting titled The Art of Australia, still considered an important work.

He appeared with Lewis Nkosi and Olivier Todd in Three Swings on a Pendulum, a programme about "Swinging London" in 1967.

Hughes wrote and narrated the BBC eight-part series The Shock of the New (1980) on the development of modern art since the Impressionists. It was produced and in part directed by Lorna Pegram. It was accompanied by a book with the same title. John O'Connor of The New York Times said, "Agree or disagree, you will not be bored. Mr. Hughes has a disarming way of being provocative."

External videos
- Booknotes interview with Hughes on American Visions: The Epic History of Art in America, July 20, 1997, C-SPAN

Hughes's TV series American Visions (1997) reviewed the history of American art since the Revolution. Hughes's documentary on Francisco Goya, Goya: Crazy Like a Genius (2002), was broadcast on the first night of the new British domestic digital service, BBC Four. He created a one-hour update to The Shock of the New, titled The New Shock of the New, which first aired in 2004. He published the first volume of his memoirs, Things I Didn’t Know, in 2006.

Following his death, Jonathan Jones wrote in The Guardian that Hughes "was simply the greatest art critic of our time and it will be a long while before we see his like again. He made criticism look like literature. He also made it look morally worthwhile. He lent a nobility to what can often seem a petty way to spend your life. Hughes could be savage, but he was never petty. There was purpose to his lightning bolts of condemnation".

=== As a journalist and historian ===
Hughes and Harold Hayes were recruited in 1978 to anchor the new ABC News (US) newsmagazine 20/20. Their only broadcast, on 6 June 1978, proved so controversial that, less than a week later, ABC News president Roone Arledge terminated the contracts of both men, replacing them with veteran TV host Hugh Downs.

Hughes's book The Fatal Shore followed in 1987. A study of the British penal colonies and early European settlement of Australia, it became an international best-seller. During the late 1990s, Hughes was a prominent supporter of the Australian Republican Movement. Australia: Beyond the Fatal Shore (2000) was a series musing on modern Australia and Hughes's relationship with it. During production, Hughes was involved in a near-fatal road accident.

== Personal life ==
Hughes met his first wife, Danne Emerson, in London in 1967. Together they became involved in the counterculture of the 1960s, exploring drug use and sexual freedom. They divorced in 1981; she died of a brain tumour in 2003. Their son, Danton, Hughes's only child, was named after the French revolutionary Georges Danton. Danton Hughes, a sculptor, committed suicide in April 2001; he was found by his partner, fashion designer Jenny Kee, with whom he had been in a long-term relationship. Robert Hughes later wrote: "I miss Danton and always will, although we had been miserably estranged for years and the pain of his loss has been somewhat blunted by the passage of time".

Hughes was married to his second wife, Victoria Whistler, from 1981 until their divorce in 1996.

In 1999, Hughes was involved in a near-fatal car accident south of Broome, Western Australia. He was returning from a fishing trip and driving on the wrong side of the road when he collided head on with another car carrying three occupants. He was trapped in the car for three hours before being airlifted to Perth in critical condition. Hughes was in a coma for five weeks after the crash. In a 2000 court hearing, Hughes's defence barrister alleged that the occupants of the other car had been transporting illicit drugs at the time of the accident and were at fault. In 2003 Hughes pleaded guilty to dangerous driving causing bodily harm and was fined A$2,500. Hughes recounts the story of the accident and his recovery in the first chapter of his 2006 memoir Things I Didn't Know.

In 2001, Hughes wed his third wife, the American artist and art director Doris Downes. "Apart from being a talented painter, she saved my life, my emotional stability, such as it is", he said.

== Death ==
After a long illness, reportedly exacerbated by some 50 years of alcohol consumption, Hughes died at Calvary Hospital in The Bronx, New York City, on 6 August 2012, with his wife at his bedside. He was also survived by two stepsons from his wife's previous marriage, Freeborn Garrettson Jewett IV and Fielder Douglas Jewett; his brothers, Tom and Geoffrey Hughes; a sister, Constance Crisp; and many nieces and nephews.

== Assessment ==
When The Shock of the New was proposed to the BBC, television programmers were sceptical that a journalist could properly follow the aristocratic tone of Kenneth Clark, whose Civilisation had been so successful. The Shock of the New proved to be a popular and critical success: it has been assessed "much the best synoptic introduction to modern art ever written", taking as its premise the vitality gained by modern art when it ceded the need to replicate nature in favour of a more direct expression of human experience and emotion. Hughes's explanations of modern art benefited from the coherence of his judgments, and were marked by his ability to summarise the essential qualities of his subject.

Whether positive or negative, his judgments were enthusiastic. He championed London painters like Frank Auerbach and Lucian Freud, helping to popularise the latter in the United States, and wrote with unabashed admiration for Francisco Goya and Pierre Bonnard. By contrast Hughes was dismissive of much postmodernism and neo-expressionism, of painters like Julian Schnabel and David Salle, as well as the vicissitudes of a money-fuelled art market. While his reviews expressed antipathy for the avant-garde, he was beholden neither to any theory nor ideology, and managed to provoke both ends of the political spectrum. He distrusted novelty in art for its own sake, yet he was also disdainful of a conservative aesthetic that avoided risk. He famously labelled contemporary Australian indigenous art as "the last great art movement of the 20th century". Hughes, according to Adam Gopnik, was drawn to work that was rough-hewn, "craft attempted with passion."

Hughes's critical prose, vivid in both praise and indignation, has been compared to that of George Bernard Shaw, Jonathan Swift and William Shakespeare. "His prose", according to a colleague, "was lithe, muscular and fast as a bunch of fives. He was incapable of writing the jargon of the art world, and consequently was treated by its mandarins with fear and loathing." In different moods he could write that "Schnabel’s work is to painting what Stallone’s is to acting: a lurching display of oily pectorals," as well as conclude that Antoine Watteau "was a connoisseur of the unplucked string, the immobility before the dance, the moment that falls between departure and nostalgia."

== Honours ==
- 1982: Frank Jewett Mather Award for art criticism, given by the College Art Association of America.
- 1985: second Frank Jewett Mather Award
- 1987: named New York Public Library Literary Lion
- 1988: named recipient of the American Academy of Achievement's Golden Plate Award.
- 1988: W. H. Smith Literary Award for The Fatal Shore
- 1991: appointed Officer of the Order of Australia (AO) in the 1991 Queen's Birthday Honours for "service to art and to the promotion of Australian culture"
- 1995: granted an Honorary Doctor of Letters by the University of Melbourne
- 1996: elected to membership of the American Academy of Arts and Sciences
- 1997: elected one of 40 "Living National Treasures" after a general vote conducted by the Australian media on behalf of the National Trust of Australia
- 2000: London Sunday Times Writer of the Year (previous recipients of the award including Anthony Burgess, Nobel laureate Seamus Heaney, and Salman Rushdie)
- 2006: Creu de Sant Jordi
- 2007: New South Wales Premier's Literary Awards Douglas Stewart Prize for non-fiction for Things I Didn't Know: a Memoir
- 2009: The Mona Lisa Curse – Winner of the 2009 Grierson Award for Best Documentary on the Arts, Oxford Film and Television for Channel 4, UK
- 2009: International Emmy Award for Best Arts Programming, The Mona Lisa Curse, Oxford Film and Television for Channel 4, UK

== Bibliography ==
=== Books ===
- Hughes, Robert (1965). Donald Friend. Sydney: Edwards and Shaw.
- — (1966). The Art of Australia. Penguin. ISBN 0-14-020935-2.
- — (1968). Heaven and Hell in Western Art. London: Weidenfeld & Nicolson. ISBN 978-0-297-17671-8.
- — (1987). The Fatal Shore. Alfred A. Knopf Inc. ISBN 0-394-50668-5.
- — (1989). Lucian Freud Paintings. Thames & Hudson. ISBN 978-0-500-27535-1.
- — (1990). Frank Auerbach. London: Thames & Hudson. ISBN 978-0-500-09211-8.
- — (1991). Nothing if Not Critical: Selected Essays on Art and Artists (Including 'SoHoiad'). London: The Harvill Press. ISBN 1-86046-859-4.
- — (1991). The Shock of the New: Art and the Century of Change (updated and enlarged ed.). Thames and Hudson. ISBN 0-500-27582-3.
- — (1992). Barcelona. New York: Vintage. ISBN 978-0-394-58027-2.
- — (1993). Amish: The Art Of The Quilt. A.A. Knopf. ISBN 978-0-679-75142-7.
- — (1993). Culture of Complaint: The Fraying of America. Oxford University Press. ISBN 0-19-507676-1.
- — (1998). A Jerk on One End: Reflections of a Mediocre Fisherman. Ballantine Publishing. ISBN 0-345-42283-X.
- — (1998). American Visions: The Epic History of Art in America. London: The Harvill Press. ISBN 1-86046-533-1.
- — (2001). Barcelona: the Great Enchantress. National Geographic. ISBN 0-7922-6794-X. (Condensed version of Barcelona)
- — (2004). Goya. Vintage. ISBN 0-09-945368-1.
- — (2006). Things I Didn't Know: A Memoir. Alfred A. Knopf Inc. ISBN 1-4000-4444-8.
- — (2011). Rome: A Cultural, Visual and Personal History. New York: Knopf. ISBN 978-0-307-70058-2.

=== Critical studies and reviews ===
- Stothard, Peter (September 2011). "The old BC/AD, BCE/CE : errors abound in Robert Hughes's history of Rome". Australian Book Review. 334: 8–9.

== Biographies ==
- Anderson, Patricia (2009). Robert Hughes: The Australian Years, Sydney: Pandora Press; ISBN 978-0-9579142-2-3
- Britain, Ian (1997). Once An Australian: Journeys with Barry Humphries, Clive James, Germaine Greer and Robert Hughes, Oxford University Press; ISBN 0195537424
