= Albert Coons =

American physician, pathologist and immunologist (1912–1978)

Albert Hewett Coons
- Born: June 28, 1912; Gloversville, New York, U.S.
- Died: September 30, 1978 (aged 66); Brookline, Massachusetts
- Education: Williams College (BS); Harvard Medical School (M.D.)
- Awards: Lasker Award (1959); Paul Ehrlich and Ludwig Darmstaedter Prize (1961); Gairdner Foundation International Award (1962)
- Scientific career
- Fields: Physician, internist, educator, author, immunologist, pathologist
- Workplaces: Harvard University

Albert Hewett Coons (June 28, 1912 – September 30, 1978) was an American physician, pathologist, and immunologist. He was the first person to conceptualize and develop immunofluorescent techniques for labeling antibodies in the early 1940s.

== Early years ==
Coons was born in Gloversville, New York, on June 28, 1912, the son of Albert Selmser and Marion (née Hewett) Coons. His father was the president of a glove-manufacturing company, and his grandfather, Eugene Coons, was a physician. He was educated in Gloversville public schools, graduated with a B.S. from Williams College (Williamstown, Massachusetts) in 1933, and received his M.D. degree from Harvard Medical School in 1937. Thereafter, Albert pursued residency training in internal medicine at Massachusetts General Hospital in Boston, Massachusetts. During the final years of his house-officership, Coons joined the Thorndike Memorial Laboratory and was given a fellowship position in bacteriology and immunology. In that capacity, he came under the professional influence of Hans Zinsser, a pioneering and dynamic immunologist and microbiologist.

Coons took a vacation trip to Berlin, Germany, in 1939, where he had a scientific epiphany. Having discussed with colleagues the immunological nature of the "Aschoff nodule" (an intracardiac, endomyocardial collection of myocytes and inflammatory cells) in rheumatic fever, Albert mulled over the nature of the antigens and antibodies that were involved in its formation. He later wrote: "In strange cities, visitors have many hours alone. It struck me that this theory [of immunological hypersensitivity as the etiology of the Aschoff nodule] had never been tested and indeed could not be tested without the demonstration of antibody or antigen, preferably both, in the local lesions. I considered that it might be easier to find the antigen than the antibody... The notion of labeling an antibody molecule with a visible label was perfectly obvious in such a context." When Coons shared these thoughts with German scientific colleagues, they were highly skeptical that such a task could be accomplished. Knowledge of antibody structure was rudimentary, a method for attaching a fluorescent molecule to antibodies did not exist, and even the very synthesis of such chemical tags was in its scientific infancy. Nonetheless, undeterred, Albert returned to Boston to tackle the project.

== Military service ==
In 1942, Coons's research was interrupted by a call to serve in the Medical Corps of the United States Army during World War II. He shipped out to the southwest Pacific Theater with the 105th General U.S. Army Hospital, as its chief laboratory officer. The 105th saw action in New Guinea, the Solomon Islands, and the Philippines. Coons was discharged from the Army at the end of 1945 with the rank of Major (O4). He was awarded the Asiatic-Pacific Campaign Medal and the World War II Victory Medal.

Asiatic-Pacific Campaign Medal ribbon

World War II Victory Medal ribbon

== Career ==
Returning to Harvard Medical School, Coons continued his work on immunohistochemistry, in collaboration with Louis Fieser—an organic chemist—and his colleagues. Before the war, they had been successful in coupling anthracene isocyanate—a fluorophore—to antipneumococcus antibodies. The resulting product retained its immunological function, and was capable of agglutinating pneumococcal bacteria. In addition, the organisms were brightly fluorescent and could be seen easily with a microscope that was fitted with an excitational ultraviolet light source. This basic laboratory paradigm was later applied to many antigens and antibodies, launching the clinical disciplines of diagnostic immunofluorescence microscopy for bacteriology and immunology, immunocytology, and immunohistochemistry in anatomic pathology. These methods are widely used today, globally, in clinical medicine and cell biology.

Many scientists spent time as fellows in Coons's Harvard laboratory. They, in turn, further developed the technique of immunohistology, as applied to electron microscopy and light microscopy. Coons progressed through the academic ranks at Harvard Medical School, and in 1953 was appointed Career Investigator for the American Heart Association. He completed additional work on in vitro and in vivo antibody production and the condition of immunological "tolerance". In recognition of his achievements, Coons was given the prestigious Albert Lasker Award in Basic Research in 1959. Coons was admitted as a member of the National Academy of Sciences in 1962. In 1970, he was given a named Harvard University Chair in the Department of Bacteriology and Immunology, and later, in the Department of Pathology. He was president of the American Association of Immunologists (1960–1961) and a councillor and president of the Histochemistry Society, and was given several other awards and international honorary academic degrees. These included the Paul Ehrlich Award in 1961, the Passano Award in 1962, the Gairdner Foundation Annual Award in 1963, the Emil von Behringer Prize in 1966, and honorary Sc.D. degrees from Williams College, Yale University, and Emory University. Despite those accolades, Coons remained a modest, affable, and quiet person who was devoted to his work, family, friends, and students.

== Personal life ==
Coons died of coronary artery disease and congestive heart failure in September, 1978, in Brookline, Massachusetts. He is buried in Cambridge, Massachusetts. Coons was survived by his wife, Phyllis (née Watts) [1917-2002], a writer for the Boston Globe newspaper; his son, Albert H., Jr. (1957–2003), a Boston attorney; and four daughters: Elizabeth, a medical editor; Susan, an educator; Hilary, a clinical psychologist; and Wendy, a social worker.
