= The Fatal Shore =

1986 book by Robert Hughes

The Fatal Shore: The Epic of Australia's Founding
- Author: Robert Hughes
- Subject: History of Australia
- Publisher: Alfred A. Knopf
- Publication date: 1986
- Media type: hardback
- Pages: 688
- Awards: Duff Cooper Prize 1987; WH Smith Literary Award 1988
- ISBN: 0-394-50668-5 First Knopf edition

The Fatal Shore: The Epic of Australia's Founding is a 1986 book by Robert Hughes. It provides a history of the early years of British colonisation of Australia, and especially the history and social effects of Britain's convict transportation system. It also addresses the historical, political and sociological reasons that led to British settlement. It was first published in 1986.

Hughes was an Australian who became an internationally well-known art critic, living in Europe and then New York, where he became art critic for Time magazine. Hughes's interest in Australia's convict era began in the early 1970s, when he was filming a TV documentary about the history of Australian art that took him to Port Arthur in Tasmania.

== Awards ==
- 1987 Duff Cooper Prize.
- 1988 WH Smith Literary Award.

== Publication history ==
The Fatal Shore was originally published in 1986 by Alfred A. Knopf in the United States and by William Collins in the UK, and subsequently published in paperback in the UK by Collins Harvill in 1987. The Folio Society published a slipcased premium edition in 1998, extending to a fourth printing in 2006.

== Reception ==
Australian novelist Thomas Keneally, in a review for The New York Times, described the book as "an authoritative and engrossing record," stating that "although the story of the convict system has recently been covered by a number of Australian historians, this account, richly peopled with bizarre and compelling characters, is probably the most full-blooded and monumental treatment the subject has been given."

Brian Smith, writing in the World Socialist Web Site, gave a positive review of the book, declaring that it "provide[s] a vivid portrayal of the human cost of Britain's colonial venture and how these experiences have helped shape modern Australia."

Historian Geoffrey Blainey wrote in A Shorter History of Australia that "Robert Hughes's wonderfully written history of the convicts, The Fatal Shore, was to entice more readers than any other book on Australia's history, but he loaded the dice when he likened the convict system to the Gulag Archipelago in the Soviet Union."

In a 2013 Quadrant article, historian Keith Windschuttle argued that The Fatal Shore "remains the most widely read representation of the old anti-British historical paradigm created from the 1940s to the 1970s by Marxists and other leftists in university history departments." Windschuttle wrote that "Hughes’s gift for the dramatic phrase led him to go further than his sources and argue that nineteenth-century New South Wales was actually a precursor to Stalin’s Gulag Archipelago."

== In popular culture ==
- The book is featured in the Netflix TV series The Punisher in the episode "My Brother's Keeper." One of the main characters, Amy (Giorgia Whigham), is seen reading it.
- American comedian Doug Stanhope has mentioned the book numerous times during interviews, most notably during The Joe Rogan Experience podcast #1144 (at around the 56-minute mark), where he comments on the number of pages and remarks on the level of brutality ever-present in Australia's convict past.
