= Immunofluorescence =

Technique used for light microscopy

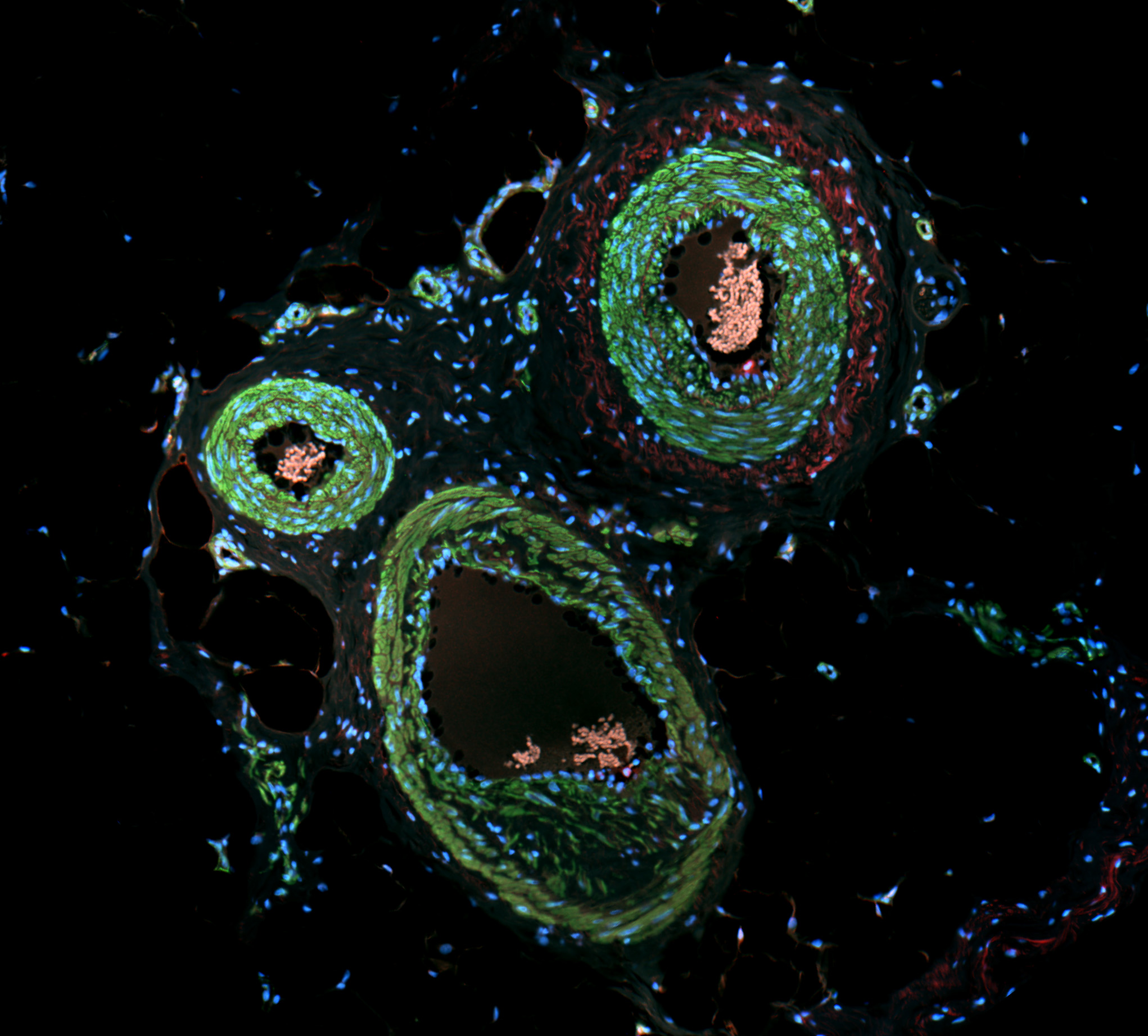
Vasculature of porcine skin under fluorescence (Smooth muscle actin with AlexaFluor 488). Green = smooth muscle actin (SMA) with Alexa 488 fluorophore. Blue = DAPI counterstain. Red = auto-fluorescence.

Immunofluorescence (IF) is a light microscopy-based technique that allows detection and localization of a wide variety of target biomolecules within a cell or tissue at a quantitative level. The technique utilizes the binding specificity of antibodies and antigens. The specific region an antibody recognizes on an antigen is called an epitope. Several antibodies can recognize the same epitope but differ in their binding affinity. The antibody with the higher affinity for a specific epitope will surpass antibodies with a lower affinity for the same epitope.

By conjugating the antibody to a fluorophore, the position of the target biomolecule is visualized by exciting the fluorophore and measuring the emission of light in a specific predefined wavelength using a fluorescence microscope. It is imperative that the binding of the fluorophore to the antibody itself does not interfere with the immunological specificity of the antibody or the binding capacity of its antigen.

Immunofluorescence is a widely used example of immunostaining (using antibodies to stain proteins) and is a specific example of immunohistochemistry (the use of the antibody-antigen relationship in tissues). This technique primarily utilizes fluorophores to visualize the location of the antibodies, while others provoke a color change in the environment containing the antigen of interest or make use of a radioactive label. Immunofluorescent techniques that utilized labelled antibodies were conceptualized in the 1940s by Albert H. Coons.

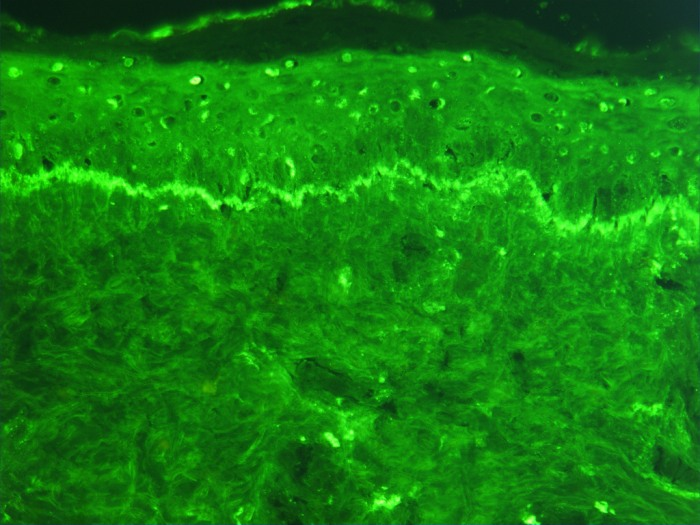
Photomicrograph of a histological section of human skin prepared for direct immunofluorescence using an anti-IgG antibody. The skin is from a patient with systemic lupus erythematosus and shows IgG deposit at two different places: The first is a band-like deposit along the epidermal basement membrane ("lupus band test" is positive). The second is within the nuclei of the epidermal cells (anti-nuclear antibodies).

Immunofluorescence is used to analyze the distribution of proteins, glycans, small biological and non-biological molecules, and visualization of structures such as intermediate-sized filaments.

If the topology of a cell membrane is undetermined, epitope insertion into proteins can be used in conjunction with immunofluorescence to determine structures within the cell membrane. Immunofluorescence (IF) can also be used as a "semi-quantitative" method to gain insight into the levels and localization patterns of DNA methylation. IF can additionally be used in combination with other, non-antibody methods of fluorescent staining, e.g., the use of DAPI to label DNA.

Examination of immunofluorescence specimens can be conducted utilizing various microscope configurations, including the epifluorescence microscope, confocal microscope, and widefield microscope.

== Types ==
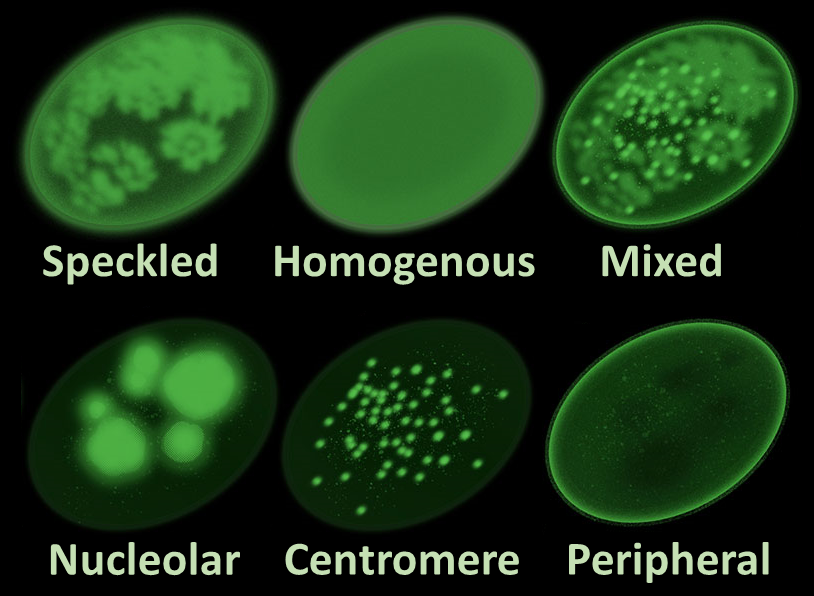
Main antinuclear antibody patterns on immunofluorescence.

=== Preparation of fluorescence ===
To perform immunofluorescence staining, a fluorophore must be conjugated ("tagged") to an antibody. Staining procedures can be applied to both retained intracellular expressed antibodies, or to cell surface antigens on living cells. There are two general classes of immunofluorescence techniques: primary (direct) and secondary (indirect). The following descriptions will focus primarily on these classes in terms of conjugated antibodies.

=== Primary (direct) ===
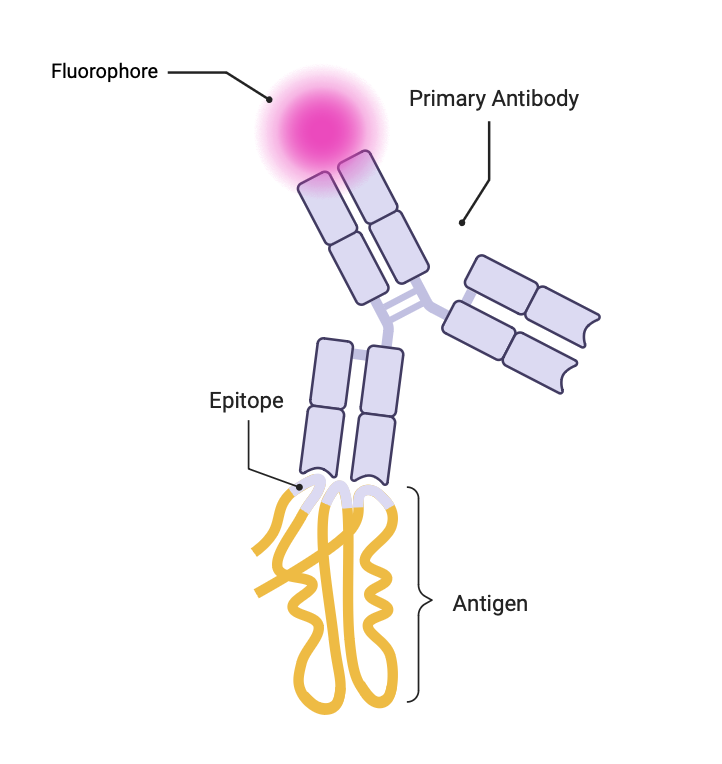
Basic concept of Primary Immunofluorescence: An antibody with a conjugated fluorophore, that is specifically bound to an epitope on the target molecule.

Primary (direct) immunofluorescence (DIF) uses a single antibody, conjugated to a fluorophore. The antibody recognizes the target molecule (antigen) and binds to a specific region, called the epitope. The attached fluorophore can be detected via fluorescent microscopy, which, depending on the type of fluorophore, will emit a specific wavelength of light once excited.

The direct attachment of the fluorophore to the antibody reduces the number of steps in the sample preparation procedure, saving time and reducing non-specific background signal during analysis. This also limits the possibility of antibody cross-reactivity, and possible mistakes throughout the process. One disadvantage of DIF is the limited number of antibodies that can bind to the antigen. This limitation may reduce sensitivity to the technique. When the target protein is available in only small concentrations, a better approach would be secondary IF, which is considered to be more sensitive than DIF when compared to Secondary (Indirect) Immunofluorescence.

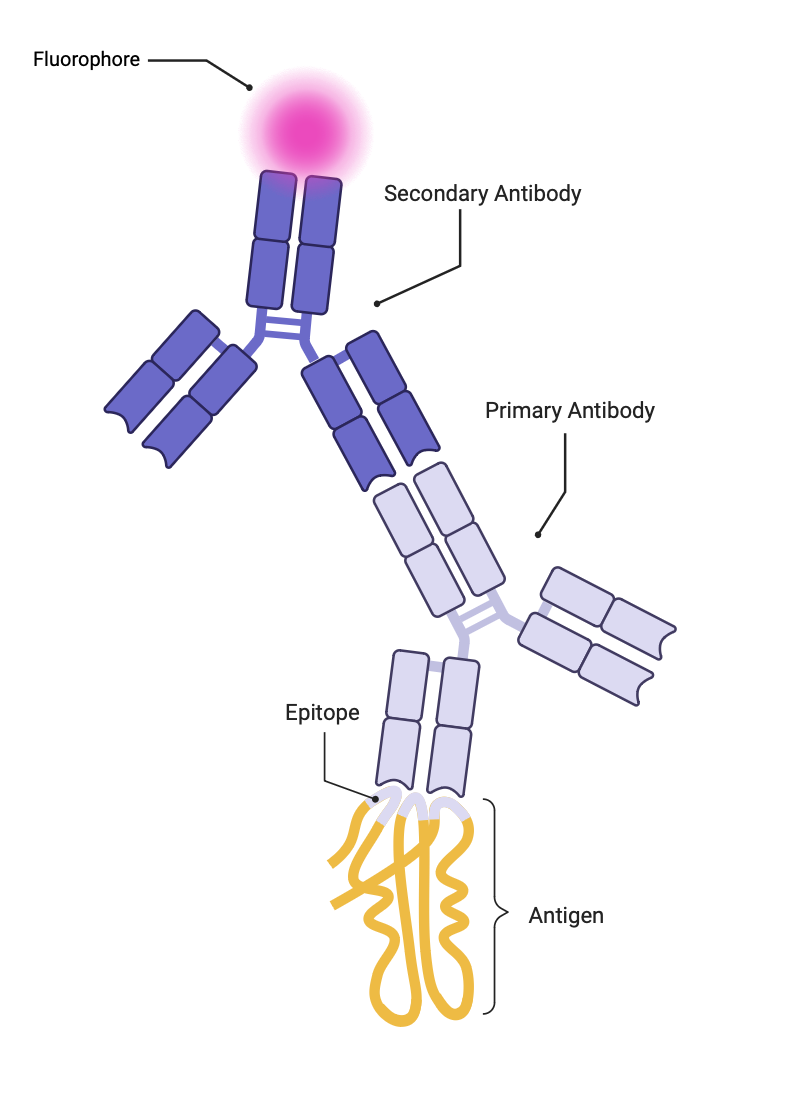
Basic concept of Secondary Immunofluorescence: Secondary antibody, with a conjugated fluorophore, bound to a primary antibody that is specifically bound to an epitope on the target molecule.

=== Secondary (indirect) ===
Secondary (indirect) immunofluorescence (SIF) is similar to direct immunofluorescence, however the technique utilizes two types of antibodies whereas only one of them have a conjugated fluorophore. The antibody with the conjugated fluorophore is referred to as the secondary antibody, while the unconjugated is referred to as the primary antibody.

The principle of this technique is that the primary antibody specifically binds to the epitope on the target molecule, whereas the secondary antibody, with the conjugated fluorophore, recognizes and binds to the primary antibody.

This technique is considered to be more sensitive than primary immunofluorescence, because multiple secondary antibodies can bind to the same primary antibody. The increased number of fluorophore molecules per antigen increases the amount of emitted light, and thus amplifies the signal. There are different methods for attaining a higher fluorophore-antigen ratio such as the Avidin-Biotin Complex (ABC method) and Labeled Streptavidin-Biotin (LSAB method).

== Limitations ==
Basic concept of the ABC-method: Primary antibody binds to the antigen, before binding to the biotinylated secondary antibody. Avidin-Biotin enzyme complex (ABC) then attaches to the secondary antibody.

Immunofluorescence is only limited to fixed (i.e. dead) cells, when studying structures within the cell, as antibodies generally do not penetrate intact cellular or subcellular membranes in living cells, because they are large proteins. To visualize these structures, antigenic material must be fixed firmly on its natural localization inside the cell. To study structures within living cells, in combination with fluorescence, one can utilize recombinant proteins containing fluorescent protein domains, e.g., green fluorescent protein (GFP). The GFP-technique involves altering the genetic information of the cells.

A significant problem with immunofluorescence is photobleaching, the fluorophore's permanent loss of ability to emit light. To mitigate the risk of photobleaching, one can employ different strategies. By reducing or limiting the intensity, or timespan of light exposure, the absorption-emission cycle of fluorescent light is decreased, thus preserving the fluorophore's functionality. One can also increase the concentration of fluorophores, or opt for more robust fluorophores that exhibit resilience against photobleaching such as Alexa Fluors, Seta Fluors, or DyLight Fluors.

Basic concept of the LSAB-method: Utilizes a Streptavidin–enzyme conjugate for the identification of the biotinylated secondary antibody which is bound to the primary antibody. This approach is applicable when the Avidin–Biotin complex in the ABC method becomes too large.

Other problems that may arise when using immunofluorescence techniques include autofluorescence, spectral overlap and non-specific staining. Autofluorescence includes the natural fluorescence emitted from the sample tissue or cell itself. Spectral overlap happens when a fluorophore has a broad emission specter, that overlaps with the specter of another fluorophore, thus giving rise to false signals. Non-specific staining occurs when the antibody, containing the fluorophore, binds to unintended proteins because of sufficient similarity in the epitope. This can lead to false positives. In studying the specificity of IgG staining as a method of assessing blood brain barrier leaks in mice, a 2025 study found complete reduction in non-specific staining with heating brain sections to 75 °C and significant reductions with a combination of hydrogen peroxide pretreatment and catalase inhibitor 3-AT.

== Advances ==
The main improvements to immunofluorescence lie in the development of fluorophores and fluorescent microscopes. Fluorophores can be structurally modified to improve brightness and photostability, while preserving spectral properties and cell permeability.

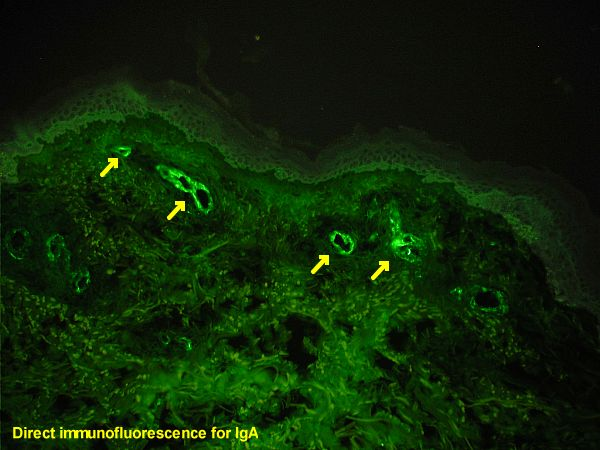
Photomicrograph of a histological section of human skin prepared for direct immunofluorescence using an anti-IgA antibody. The skin is from a patient with Henoch–Schönlein purpura: IgA deposits are found in the walls of small superficial capillaries (yellow arrows). The pale wavy green area on top is the epidermis, the bottom fibrous area is the dermis.

Super-resolution fluorescence microscopy methods can produce images with a higher resolution than those microscopes imposed by the diffraction limit. This enables the determination of structural details within the cell. Super-resolution in fluorescence, more specifically, refers to the ability of a microscope to prevent the simultaneous fluorescence of adjacent spectrally identical fluorophores (spectral overlap). Some of the recently developed super-resolution fluorescent microscope methods include stimulated emission depletion (STED) microscopy, saturated structured-illumination microscopy (SSIM), fluorescence photoactivation localization microscopy (FPALM), and stochastic optical reconstruction microscopy (STORM).

== Notable people ==
- Albert Hewett Coons (1912–1978), physician, pathologist and immunologist
- Cornelia Mitchell Downs (1892–1987), microbiologist and journalist

== See also ==
- Antibodies
- Cutaneous conditions with immunofluorescence findings
- Fluorescence
- Immunochemistry
- Immunohistochemistry
- Patching and Capping
