= The Shock of the New =

1980 BBC TV series on the development of modern art

- Directed by: David Lewis Richardson / Lorna Pegram
- Produced by: Lorna Pegram
- Narrated by: Robert Hughes
- Release date: 1980

The Shock of the New is an eight-part documentary television series about the development of modern art written and presented in 1980 by Australian art critic Robert Hughes for the BBC, in association with Time-Life Films. Hughes also wrote a book to accompany the series. It was produced by Lorna Pegram, who also directed three of the episodes.

In 2004 Hughes created a one-hour update to The Shock of the New titled The NEW Shock of the New.

== Series outline ==
The series addressed the development of modern art since the Impressionists and was accompanied by a book of the same name.

The series consisted of eight episodes each one hour long (58 min approx). It was re-broadcast on PBS in the United States. In the three case where PBS changed the titles, they are given in square brackets below. Quotations are spoken by Judi Dench and Martin Jarvis.

1. Mechanical Paradise – how the development of technology influenced art between 1880 and end of World War I. Cubism and Futurism
  - Cézanne, Picasso, Braque, Gris, Leger, Delaunay, Marinetti, Boccioni, Balla, Severini, Picabia, Duchamp
2. The Powers That Be [Shapes of Dissent] – examining the relationship between modern art and authority. Dada, Constructivism, Futurism, architecture of power
  - World War I and industrialised death, Exile and intellectuals as a class, Lenin, Tzara, Janco, Arp, Ball, Duchamp, Kirchner, Ernst, Höch, Dix, de Chirico, Hausmann, Grosz, Gabo, Tatlin, Moholy-Nagy, Lissitzky, Rodchenko, Marinetti, Prampolini, Speer, Piacentini, Lincoln Center, Kennedy Center, Albany Mall, Picasso's Guernica, Tinguely
3. The Landscape of Pleasure – examining art's relationship with the pleasures of nature, and visions of paradise 1870s to 1950s. Impressionism, Post-Impressionism, Fauvism
  - Fête champêtre, Titian, Giorgione, Jean-Antoine Watteau, Gainsborough, Bourgeoisie, Seurat, Claude Monet, Paul Cézanne, the vivid colours of the South, Paul Gauguin, André Derain, Maurice de Vlaminck, Henri Matisse, Pierre Bonnard, Braque, Picasso, late Matisse
4. Trouble in Utopia – examining the aspirations and reality of modern architecture. International Style, Art Nouveau, Futurist architecture, urban planning
  - Johnson, Boullée, Garnier, Chiattone, Sant'Elia, Melnikov, Rodchenko, Leonidov, Sullivan, Labrouste, Berg, Mies, Le Corbusier, Chandigarh, Werkbund exhibition 1927, Bauhaus, Gropius, Behrens, De Stijl, Rietveld, van Duesberg, Mondrian, La Defense, Pruitt–Igoe, Costa, Niemeyer, Brasilia
5. The Threshold of Liberty – examining the surrealists' attempts to make art without restrictions.
  - May 1968, Breton, Ernst, de Chirico, Böcklin, Ducasse, child art, madness, Rousseau, Cheval, Miro, Gaudi, Dalí, flea market, Jean, Brauner, Paalen, Oppenheim, Man Ray, Magritte, de Sade, Catholicism and sexual taboo, Bellmer, Cornell, Pollock, Rothko, Gorky, Hofmann, 1945 liberation, Christo, Burden, hippies and self-expression, Vietnam War, cult of youth
6. The View from the Edge [Sublime and Anxious Eye] – a look at those who made visual art from the crags and vistas of their internal world. Expressionism
  - van Gogh, Munch, Toulouse-Lautrec, Gauguin, Kirchner, Kokoschka, Soutine, Bacon, de Kooning, photographical evidence of the Holocaust, Marc, Klee, Kandinsky, Brancusi, Rothko, Pollock, Motherwell
7. Culture as Nature – examining the art that referred to the man-made world which fed off culture itself. Pop art and celebrity
  - O'Keeffe, Davis, Rauschenberg, Schwitters, Johns, Hamilton, the influence of television, Warhol, Liechtenstein, Rosenquist, Katz, Las Vegas as a single "lousy" artwork, Oldenburg, McLuhan and quantity over quality
8. The Future That Was [End of Modernity] – the commercialisation of modern art, the decline of modernism, and art without substance. Land art, performance art, and body art
  - Heizer, MoMA and rich patrons, SoHo and urban renewal, Pompidou Centre and the changing uses of art, da Panicale, art as public discourse, the Salon system, the avantgarde and the bourgeoisie, Courbet, Andre, Judd, public and private, Segal, Kienholz, Frankenthaler, Louis, Noland, Stella, Riley, fashion, the art market, Brisley, Samaras, Rainer, Hockney, Beuys, de Maria

== Production ==
The Shock of the New took three years to create, and Hughes travelled about 250,000 miles (400,000 km) during the filming to include particular places or people. The series also used archival footage of featured artists. The series was produced by Lorna Pegram, who also directed three of the episodes. Hughes remembers being directed by Pegram with her saying, "It's a clever argument, Bob dear, but what are we supposed to be looking at?".

== Broadcast ==
The series was broadcast by the BBC in 1980 in the United Kingdom. It was re-broadcast on PBS in the United States.

== Book ==
The book of the series was published in 1980 by the BBC under the title The Shock of the New: Art and the century of change. It was republished in 1991 by Thames and Hudson. The book was included by The Guardian in their list of the top 100 non-fiction books, and is still in print as of 2024.

== Video releases ==
The televised edition of The Shock of the New has been posted on the internet. and is published as a set of DVDs.

== 2004 update ==
In 2004 Hughes created a one-hour update to The Shock of the New titled The NEW Shock of the New. Topics covered the Eiffel Tower, World Trade Center, 9/11, Turner, Goya, David, Picasso's Guernica as the last truly political painting, Whitney Biennial, Warhol, fashion as the primary model of art, Koons, Duchamp, Michelangelo, Masaccio, exploding prices of the art market, Rego, Kiefer, information overload, Hockney, the skill of drawing, art as the opposite of mass media, Freud, Gilbert and George, post-modernism, slowness of painting, Mondrian, Rothko, Kelly, Scully, beauty, and Eliasson.

== See also ==
- Civilisation
- The Ascent of Man
