= James Cloyd Downs =

James Cloyd Downs ( November 6, 1885 - December 18, 1957) was an American Electrical Engineer who designed the Downs cell, the most common method of manufacture of sodium metal.

== Life ==
Downs was born in Newark, New Jersey in 1885, attended Trinity School (New York City), graduated in electrical engineering from Cooper Union in 1904. He married Mabel Lehmann, and they had five children. He died December 18, 1957 in Eugene, Oregon.

== Work ==
He worked for New York Edison Co., Acker Process Co., and Niagara Electrochemical Co, which was absorbed by DuPont. In 1924 he published his key patent 'Electrolytic process and cell'.

== Award ==
In 1934 he won the Schoellkopf Medal of the American Chemical Society for producing sodium directly from salt. The society announcement said "The use of sodium has been greatly extended by the introduction of the Downs Cell. It is employed in making sodium cyanide for heat treating steel, TEL for making ethyl gasoline, and sodium peroxide for bleaching silk, wool and cotton. Sodium also enters into numerous metallurgical processes and into the making of indigo, dyes, perfumes and pharmaceuticals.
