= Lorna Pegram =

British television producer and novelist

- Born: Lorna Gladys Hurst Woods; October 25, 1926; Ilford
- Died: May 16, 1993 (aged 66); Deal
- Education: King's College, London
- Occupations: BBC producer and novelist
- Known for: produced The Shock of the New
- Spouse: two
- Children: 3 sons

Lorna Pegram (October 25, 1926 – May 16, 1993), born Lorna Gladys Hurst Woods, was a British television producer and novelist. She produced The Shock of the New, a series about the development of modern art for the BBC. Pegram wrote seven novels.

== Life ==
Pegram was born in Ilford in 1926. Her parents were Sybil (born Hurst) and Reginald William James Woods.

She obtained a first class degree at King's College London. She then worked for the BBC on the radio programmes Listen with Mother and Woman's Hour, where she read readers' letters. In the 1950s she worked on the TV programmes The Wednesday Magazine and Look of the Week.

In the late 1960s she began her association with Robert Hughes, an art critic born in Australia.

In 1969 Carmen Callil, the publicity manager for Panther Books, persuaded Pegram to include B. S. Johnson to talk about his book The Unfortunates for the BBC art series Release. Johnson's book had eight parts that could be read in many different orders. With little negotiation, the interview was ready months before the book was ready for publication. The film included Johnson holding a mock-up of the book that was not at all similar to the final publication.

Collaborating with Hughes, she produced the BBC TV series The Shock of the New, broadcast by the BBC in 1980 and by PBS the following year in the United States. The series of eight programmes, which took three years to produce, addressed the development of modern art since the Impressionists and was accompanied by a book of the same name. Its combination of insight, wit and accessibility have been widely praised. Despite using archive film, Hughes travelled about 250,000 miles to present his thoughts about particular places or people. He remembered being directed by Pegram with her saying, "It's a clever argument, Bob dear, but what are we supposed to be looking at?"

In 1983, Pegram produced and directed two films presented by the American art historian Vincent Scully. The films were for the Metropolitan Museum of Art and WNET, based around art at the Met.

== Writing ==
Pegram left the BBC in 1984 and took to writing her novels full time. None of them became best sellers but they were well regarded. Her 1969 novel Summer Fires was thought to be one of her best.

== Personal life ==
Pegram married twice. The first time was in 1947 to fellow student Roy William Pegram; after they divorced, she kept his surname. In 1961, she married Geoffrey Charles Newton Golden who worked in advertising. She had three sons, two with Pegram and one with Golden.

== Death ==
Pegram died of lung cancer in Deal in 1993.
