= Henry Downs =

Henry Downs may refer to:

- Henry Downs (bodybuilder) (1931–2024), British amateur bodybuilder, Mr. Universe (1960)
- Henry W. Downs (1844–1911), Union Army soldier and Medal of Honor recipient

== See also ==
- Henry Downes (disambiguation)
