= Arthur Downes (police officer) =

New Zealand soldier, clerk, salesman, policeman

Arthur Leonard Downes (27 May 1895 – 1 August 1984) was a New Zealand soldier, clerk, salesman and policeman. He was born in Warwick, Warwickshire, England, on 27 May 1895.

He died in Wellington in 1984 and was buried at Akatarawa Cemetery.
