= Cornelia Mitchell Downs =

American microbiologist (1892–1987)

- Born: December 20, 1892; Kansas City, Kansas, United States
- Died: January 27, 1987 (aged 94)
- Other name: Cora Mitchell Downs
- Occupation: Scientist

Academic background
- Education: University of Kansas

Academic work
- Discipline: Microbiology
- Institutions: University of Kansas
- Main interests: Immunofluorescence; Tularemia

Cornelia "Cora" Mitchell Downs (December 20, 1892 to January 27, 1987) was an American microbiologist and journalist who completed extensive work in the areas of immunofluorescence and tularemia research.

Downs was born to Lily Louis Campbell Downs and Henry Mitchell Downs, and raised in Kansas City, Kansas. She remained at the University of Kansas for much of her educational, teaching, and research careers.

== Education ==
In 1915, Downs completed her Bachelor of Arts degree at the University of Kansas. She continued her education there to complete a Master of Arts degree in 1920, followed by a Doctor of Philosophy in bacteriology in 1924, becoming the first woman to earn a PhD from the University of Kansas. Downs also attended the University of Chicago to complete her Postgraduate degree in 1921.

== Career ==
Downs served as an educator in the Department of Bacteriology at the University of Kansas between 1917 and 1963. She taught at the university as an instructor, assistant professor, and associate professor before being appointed full professorship in 1935. During her time at the University of Kansas, Downs conducted groundbreaking microbiology research surrounding the animal immune responses to tularemia, commonly known as rabbit fever. She is also well known for her work in the development of the fluorescent antibody technique—a diagnostic technique used to identify viruses—by studying methods to simplify the synthesis of the labelling agents used in the procedure. Downs also served as a visiting investigator at the Rockefeller Institute from 1939 to 1940. She ultimately retired in 1963.

== Awards and memberships ==
Downs was recognized in Marquis Who's Who as a prominent instructor in microbiology. She was also recognized as a member of many scientific organizations including the American Society of Pathology and Bacteriology, the American Association of Immunologists, the American Association for the Advancement of Science, and the American Association of University Professors.

Downs was also a Fellow of the New York Academy of Sciences and a member of several Greek organizations and honor societies including Sigma Xi, Phi Sigma, and Delta Delta Delta.
