= Carolyn Downs (activist) =

American activist (1953–1978)

- Born: May 18, 1953; Marshall, Texas, U.S.
- Died: June 18, 1978 (aged 25); Seattle, Washington, U.S.
- Occupation: Activist
- Years active: 1972–1978
- Organization: Black Panther Party
- Known for: Carolyn Downs Family Medical Center

Carolyn Downs (May 18, 1953 – June 18, 1978) was an American activist and Black Panther Party member.

Downs was born in Marshall, Texas on May 18, 1953, and was the thirteenth of sixteen children in her family. The family moved to Seattle in 1964, and at the age of 19 she joined the Seattle Chapter of the Black Panther Party (SCBPP). She worked on their community projects, driving buses for prison visiting, cooking free breakfasts, organizing community dinners, and working in the free medical clinic which had been established in 1969 to offer the local black community baby care and testing for sickle cell anemia. There was government funding available for health care for underserved rural communities through the National Health Service Corps, and Downs and Elmer Dixon worked with other local clinics to document the need for such funding for underserved urban communities also. In 1976 the relevant legislation was amended and funding became available. The Black Panthers opened a new free-standing clinic in 1978, but Downs died on cancer, aged 25, before it was fully open.

The clinic was named the Carolyn Downs Family Medical Centre in her memory, and after several reorganisations it still serves the community of Seattle, from its building on East Yesler Way in central Seattle.
