= Doris Downes =

American botanical artist

- Doris Downes, The Path to Dinorah, Oil on Linen, 2010.
- Born: Doris Raley Downes; 1961 (age 64–65)
- Occupations: Botanical Artist, author, Creative Director, Interactive Designer
- Employer(s): Sotheby's, Environmental Governance Institute
- Spouse(s): Freeborn G. Jewett III; Robert Hughes
- Children: 2
- Relatives: Willard A. Downes (uncle); J. Frank Raley (uncle)
- Awards: Silver award, SPD (The Society of Publication Designers), Gold Award, OZZIE, Design Excellence

Doris Downes (born 1961, Doris Raley Downes) is an American botanical artist, painter of natural history, and a writer for the Environmental Governance Institute. She also works in Interactive Design, and was Creative Director at Sotheby's, before becoming a full-time artist in 2003. She is also the literary executor to Robert Hughes.

== Life and work ==
Downes was raised in Fredericksburg, Virginia and St. Mary's Maryland. She is the daughter of the late Fielder Bradford Downes of Fredericksburg and Doris Anne Downes (née Raley) of St. Mary's. She is the niece of artist Willard A. Downes (1908–2000) and of former Democrat State Senator from Maryland, J. Frank Raley (1926–2012). She became interested in flowers when hiking in woodlands near her home, whilst young; she was taught to draw by her father, who was an artist and encouraged her to see nature from an artistic viewpoint.

She earned a joint degree in arts and sciences from the University of Maryland. Her career started as an art director in New York City in publication design and interactive design including Newsweek, Condé Nast Publications and The Wall Street Journal, She was awarded a Silver award from SPD (The Society of Publication Designers) and a Gold Ozzie Award for Design Excellence. She became Vice President and Creative Director of Sotheby's and Sotheby's Interactive.

She has two children by her first marriage, Freeborn Garrettson Jewett IV and Fielder Douglas Jewett. She met the Australian art critic, Robert Hughes in 1997. and in 1998, he had a near-fatal car crash, was in a coma and then faced prosecution. She flew to Australia to be with him. He said, "Apart from being a talented painter, she saved my life, my emotional stability, such as it is," and, "I really wouldn't have got through it if it hadn't been for Doris. I know that's a sentimental thing to say—it's the sort of thing you're supposed to say—but it is true." In 2001, she married Hughes in the Saló de Cent, the town hall in Barcelona. Hughes died in 2012 at Calvary Hospital in the Bronx, New York, while in hospice care. Downes has continued to concentrate on painting, specialising in flowers, birds and other motifs related to natural history .

While in employment, she had shown her work in the Sotheby's gallery in New York. Her first solo exhibition after becoming a full-time artist was held in 2003 at the Sala Parés Gallery in Barcelona, in the Espacio Fama, showing watercolours of orchids, hibiscos, irises and tulips, painted from life. Olga Spiegel described them as "worked with a modern sensitivity that makes use of the expressive and tactile values of the paper"^{[a]} and said:

Downes shows the particularities of the flower, its nature, its fullness or destined decay, the curve or arabesque of stems and petals subject to the whim of the wind, always with a great mastery of drawing and the possibilities of watercolour to show the light, to heighten the colours or to reduce them to grey, as in the triptych Chinese hibiscus.^{[b]}

J. J. Navarro Arisa in El Mundo considered her work to be proof that flower painting does not have to be an anachronism or merely decorative pastime, but can demonstrate a contemporary sensitivity,^{[c]} and that she exemplified a combination of scientific and aesthetic inquiry.^{[d]} Hughes wrote the catalogue for the show.

A series of her limited edition prints were published by Circulo del Arte, in Barcelona; these were completed in collaboration with the lithographer, Vincenz Aznar. In 2005, her work was included in the show, Art and the Garden, curated by Ronny Cohen at the Spanierman Gallery, New York. She is an artist in the book, American Floral: a Survey, (published by Eaton Fine Art); she has exhibited in the Summer Show at the Royal Academy in London; and is a member of the National Association of Women in the Arts (N.A.W.A.) and the American Society of Botanical Artists.

Downes lives and works in New York and has a farmhouse in Briarcliff Manor, New York.
