= Georgina Downs =

British journalist

- Born: 1972 (age 53–54); Sussex, England
- Occupations: Journalist, environmental campaigner
- Writing career
- Years active: 2006–present
- Period: 2000s–present
- Subjects: Pesticides regulation, agricultural health effects
- Notable awards: British Environment and Media Award (2006); Cosmopolitan Heroine Award (2006)
- Movement: Environmental health campaigning

Georgina Downs (born 1972, in Sussex, England), is a British journalist who is a campaigner on health effects of pesticides. After experiencing chronic illness throughout her childhood and adolescence, she launched a campaign against the use of pesticides in industrial agriculture.

== Early life ==
Downs was born in 1972, in Sussex, England. In 1983, Downs moved with her family from Pagham, West Sussex, to a house next to agricultural fields near Chichester. The nearest field adjoining the house and garden was initially used for grazing livestock, but shortly after she arrived, it was converted to arable land. According to Downs, over the following years, her health gradually worsened as the result of exposure to the pesticides used in the nearby fields. Medical tests at that time ruled out motor neurone disease and Parkinson's disease as the cause.

== UK pesticides campaign ==
After researching the subject of pesticides and their effects on human health, Downs decided to challenge government regulations. In 2008 she challenged the Department for Environment, Food and Rural Affairs (DEFRA) in the High Court of Justice, which ruled that the department did not comply with European Union regulations. The court ruled that Downs had provided "solid evidence" that residents had suffered harm to their health and that the existing approach to pesticide regulation in the UK was not, as DEFRA had argued, "reasonable, logical and lawful".

DEFRA appealed the ruling, however, and it was overturned by the Court of Appeal in July 2009. The appeal judge, Lord Justice Sullivan, ruled that the High Court justice had substituted his own evaluation of the health effect of pesticides for the evidence provided by DEFRA.

Downs said that the appeal judges had ignored the evidence that she had provided — and that the landmark High Court victory had been based on. She stated that she would take the case to the European Court of Human Rights.

In 2016 Downs launched a petition calling on the Prime Minister Theresa May to ban all crop spraying of pesticides near residents' homes, schools and playgrounds. The petition was signed by thousands of other rural residents also reporting adverse health impacts of crop spraying in their localities. The petition was also signed and supported by English barrister Michael Mansfield QC, along with other high-profile environmentalists including Stanley Johnson, Jonathon Porritt, Gordon Roddick and Ben Goldsmith, amongst others.

== Affiliations and awards ==
Since 2006 Downs has been registered as a journalist with both the International Federation of Agricultural Journalists (IFAJ) and the British Guild of Agricultural Journalists (BGAJ).

Downs won a British Environment and Media Awards (BEMA) in 2006, and was one of the winners at the inaugural Cosmopolitan Awards also in 2006 winning the Heroine award.

In 2015 Downs was nominated for The Observer Ethical Awards to find the best green Briton. A report in The Guardian said her work "promotes a vision of a green and sustainable Britain where non-chemical and natural farming methods are widely adopted."

== Other work ==
Before starting her pesticides campaign full-time, Downs was a singer-songwriter, performing in various live acoustic venues including at the Kashmir Klub in London. She has also played Matron Mama Morton in a local production of the musical Chicago.
