= Mark Downes =

English cricketer (born 1974)

Personal information
- Full name: Mark Anthony Downes
- Born: 1 August 1974 (age 52); Wellington, Shropshire, England
- Batting: Right-handed
- Bowling: Right-arm fast-medium

Domestic team information
- Years: Team
- 1999–present: Shropshire

Career statistics
Competition	List A
Matches	5
Runs scored	42
Batting average	10.50
100s/50s	–/–
Top score	16
Balls bowled	102
Wickets	3
Bowling average	38.33
5 wickets in innings	–
10 wickets in match	–
Best bowling	2/39
Catches/stumpings	2/–
- Source: Cricinfo, 2 July 2011

Mark Anthony Downes (born 1 August 1974) is an English cricketer. Downes is a right-handed batsman who bowls right-arm fast-medium. He was born in Wellington, Shropshire.

Downes made his debut for Shropshire in the 1999 MCCA Knockout Trophy against Cumberland. Downes has played Minor counties cricket for Shropshire from 1999 to present, which has included 15 Minor Counties Championship appearances and 14 MCCA Knockout Trophy appearances. He made his List A debut against Devon in the 2001 Cheltenham & Gloucester Trophy. He made 4 further List A appearances, the last of which came against Hampshire in the 2005 Cheltenham & Gloucester Trophy. In his 4 List A matches, he scored 42 runs at an average of 10.50, with a high score of 16. With the ball, he took 3 wickets at a bowling average of 38.33, with best figures of 2/39.
