= Willard A. Downes =

American artist and illustrator

- Born: October 14, 1908; Washington, D.C., U.S.
- Died: September 11, 2000 (aged 91); Gulfport, Florida
- Education: Art Students League; National Academy of Design; Industrial Arts School
- Known for: Portraits, caricatures

Willard A. Downes (1908–2000) was an American artist and illustrator. He was artistically active his entire life as a painter and illustrator. He painted portraits, landscapes and did caricatures of famous people. He was the uncle of Doris Downes, an American botanical artist.

== Biography ==
Willard Alfred Downes, was born in Washington, D.C., on October 14, 1908, and grew up in Fredericksburg, Virginia.

When he was 17 years old he relocated to New York City to pursue his artistic career. He attended the Art Students League; the National Academy of Design; and, the Industrial Arts School.

He began his professional career as a commercial illustrator and a fine arts painter. He was hired to help paint billboards for Columbia, Paramount Pictures and Warner Brothers studios in Atlantic City and Philadelphia. He worked for three newspapers in New York City as an advertising artist: The Herald Tribune; The New York Journal-American; and, The Brooklyn Eagle. His illustrations appeared in magazines such as The Saturday Evening Post, Life, Good Housekeeping, and Colliers.

In the 1930s and the 1940s he was commissioned to sketch publicity portraits of big name actors. He drew portraits of Clark Gable, Errol Flynn, Spencer Tracy, Tallulah Brockman Bankhead, Donald Crisp, and Miriam Hopkins, among others. His drawing of William Randolph Hearst for Editor & Publisher magazine led to a job at Hearst newspapers. Fawcett and Golden Books hired him to illustrate covers of their paperbacks books. He led a $15 million advertising campaign for Kent cigarettes. He introduced a series of posters called "I Am Still an American", which now is part of the Library of Congress. His movie star portraits and caricatures have been promised to the Smithsonian Institution.

In the 1950s he explored the aspects of modernism; he produced abstract paintings on a myriad of subjects. His abstract paintings, along with his posters and illustrations were exhibited at numerous museums and galleries.

He was a member of the Society of Illustrators.

Downes died on September 11, 2000, in Gulfport, Florida, at the age of 92. He is buried in the Confederate Cemetery in Fredericksburg, Virginia.
