= David Downes (New Zealand composer) =

David Downes, born 1967 in Wellington, New Zealand, is a composer of theatre and film scores, orchestral and electro-acoustic pieces. He is particularly known for his work with choreographers, and for dance-inspired music, including two CD releases, Saltwater and The Rusted Wheel of Things (originally released as Pavilion).

Downes served as a musical consultant for the 2005 film River Queen, and won the inaugural RealWorld Remixed competition as Multiman.
