= Alexander Downs =

Scottish cricketer (1876–1924)

Personal information
- Full name: Alexander Downs
- Born: 28 May 1876; Uddingston, Lanarkshire, Scotland
- Died: 17 July 1924 (aged 48); Uddingston, Lanarkshire, Scotland
- Batting: Unknown
- Role: Wicket-keeper

Domestic team information
- Years: Team
- 1907: Scotland

Career statistics
Competition	First-class
Matches	1
Runs scored	1
Batting average	0.50
100s/50s	–/–
Top score	1
Catches/stumpings	–/–
- Source: Cricinfo, 5 November 2022

Alexander Downs (28 May 1876 – 17 July 1924) was a Scottish first-class cricketer.

== Life and career ==
Downs was born Uddingston in May 1876. A club cricketer who played as a wicket-keeper for Uddingston, he made a single appearance in first-class cricket for Scotland against the touring South Africans at Edinburgh in 1907. Playing as a wicket-keeper in the Scottish team, Downs was dismissed without scoring by Bert Vogler, while following-on in their second innings he was dismissed for a single run by Reggie Schwarz. Outside of cricket, he was a partner in the family joinery and building contracting business. Downs went missing on Friday, 11 July 1924, with his body being discovered in the River Clyde nearly a week later on Thursday, 17 July near the Haughhead Bridge at Uddingston.
