= Ephraim Downs =

American clockmaker

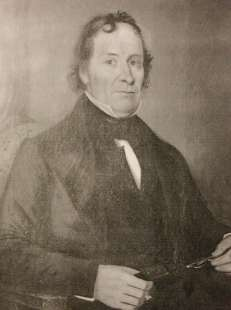
Ephraim Downs

Ephraim Downs (1787–1860) was an American clockmaker who pioneered wooden-movement clocks. In business from 1810 through 1842, he worked with Eli Terry, Silas Hoadley, and Seth Thomas in the early Connecticut clock trade.

During the 1830s, Ephraim supplied nearly seven thousand wood-movement clocks to the wholesale trade. Eighty percent of his clocks were of the thirty-hour looking glass variety. Wholesale prices for these clocks was $9.00 in 1830, but by 1839 the price was reduced by one half due to competitive price cutting and reduced manufacturing costs.

Downs sold some brass movement clocks but it is not believed that he manufactured any of this type. After 1842, he did not participate to any great extent in clock-manufacturing, though he did continue to produce and sell a few wood movements. He continued to work and ran his gristmill until 1850.

He died in Bristol, Connecticut on December 8, 1860. His old clock shop burned down around 1865. It was located on the south side of the river as was the mill, but on the east side of the road now called Downs Street, whereas the mill was on the west side. The Downs mill was taken down in 1921 and a stone monument with a water fountain was erected in its place.

== Bibliography ==
- Hounshell, David A. (1984), From the American System to Mass Production, 1800–1932: The Development of Manufacturing Technology in the United States, Baltimore, Maryland: Johns Hopkins University Press, ISBN 978-0-8018-2975-8, LCCN 83016269, OCLC 1104810110
- Russell, Lynda (2006). Bristol Historic Homes. Charleston: Arcadia.
- Smith, Eddy et al. (1907). Bristol, Connecticut. Hartford: City Printing.
