= The Downs School =

The Downs School may refer to the following schools in England:

- The Downs School, Compton, a comprehensive school in Compton, Berkshire
- The Downs Malvern, prep school in Colwall, Herefordshire
- Downs Preparatory School, a preparatory school in Bristol
- The Downs Secondary Modern, latterly the Leigh City Technology College, Dartford, Kent
