= Stephen Downes (disambiguation) =

Stephen Downes is a Canadian e-learning theorist and practitioner.

Stephen Downes may also refer to:

- Stephen Downes (footballer) (born 1981), English footballer
- Steve Downes, American voice actor and DJ
- Steve Downs, guitarist of the band Damiera
