= Henry Downes =

Henry Downes may refer to:

- Harry Downes (1910–1970), American football player and coach
- Henry Downes (bishop) (died 1735), Irish Anglican bishop

== See also ==
- Henry Downs (disambiguation)
