= Thomas William Downes =

T. W. Downes

Thomas William Downes (18 February 1868 – 6 August 1938) was a New Zealand historian, ethnologist and river works supervisor.

Downes was born in Wellington, New Zealand, on 18 February 1868. His family moved to Bulls in the 1870s and he went to school there. He married Margaret Thomson there in May 1890. They moved to Wanganui in 1898. He died in Wanganui on 6 August 1938, survived by Margaret and their married daughter.
