= Billy Down =

English footballer

- Godfrey Phillips Cigarette card featuring Billy Down

Personal information
- Full name: William Down
- Date of birth: 22 January 1898
- Place of birth: Ryhope, Sunderland, England
- Date of death: April quarter 1977 (aged 77)
- Place of death: Ashington, Northumberland, England
- Height: 5 ft 9 in (1.75 m)
- Position: Goalkeeper

Senior career*
Years	Team	Apps	(Gls)
1920–1925	Leeds United	96	(0)
1925–1927	Doncaster Rovers	50	(0)
1927–1930	Burnley	80	(0)
1930	Torquay United	0	(0)
1930	Wigan Borough	2	(0)
- * Club domestic league appearances and goals

William Down (22 January 1898 – 1977) was an English professional association footballer who played as a goalkeeper. He played over 200 matches in the Football League for four clubs during the 1920s.

== Sources ==
- Joyce, Michael (2004). Football League Players' Records 1888-1939.
