= William Downes =

William Downes may refer to:

- William Downes, 1st Baron Downes (1751–1826), Irish judge
- William Downes (cricketer) (1843–1896), New Zealand cricketer
- William F. Downes (born 1946), U.S. federal judge
