= Linda Down =

American woman born with cerebral palsy

Linda Down is an American woman born with cerebral palsy. She completed the 26.1 mile 1982 and 1984 New York City Marathon on crutches, because of her lack of motor coordination as well as muscle spasticity.

At a White House reception on October 27, 1982, President Ronald Reagan welcomed her with the thought that

"no one in that marathon showed more heart and more courage. Linda, the victim of cerebral palsy, is more familiar with the word 'victory' than 'victim'. She did the 26 miles of the marathon in 11 hours -- the first person to attempt to do that with the aid of crutches. And, Linda, if all of those people out there wouldn't say I was being political, I'd say you truly 'stayed the course".
