= Downs cell =

Electrochemical method for metallic sodium

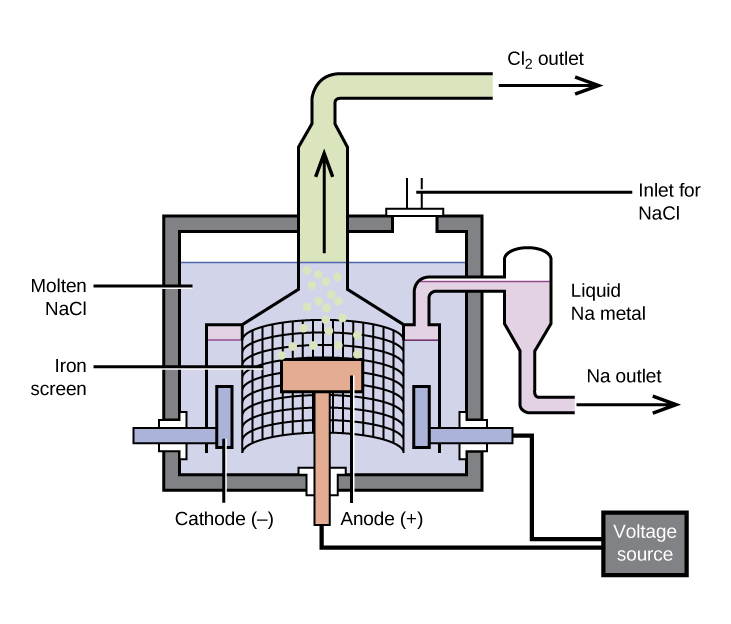
Diagram of a Downs cell electrolyzing molten NaCl into chlorine gas and sodium metal

Downs' process is an electrochemical method for the commercial preparation of metallic sodium, in which molten NaCl is electrolyzed in a special apparatus called the Downs cell. The Downs cell was invented in 1923 (patented: 1924) by the American chemist James Cloyd Downs (1885–1957).

== Operation ==
The Downs cell uses a carbon anode and an iron cathode, with molten sodium chloride as the electrolyte. Although solid sodium chloride is a poor conductor of electricity, when molten, the sodium and chloride ions are mobilized. These become charge carriers and allow conduction of electric current.

Some calcium chloride and/or chlorides of barium (BaCl_{2}) and strontium (SrCl_{2}), and, in some processes, sodium fluoride (NaF) are added to the electrolyte to reduce the temperature required to keep the electrolyte liquid (Eutectic system). Sodium chloride (NaCl) melts at 801 °C (1074 Kelvin), but a salt mixture can be kept liquid at a temperature as low as 600 °C at the mixture containing, by weight: 33.2% NaCl and 66.8% CaCl_{2}. Using pure sodium chloride causes an inseparable metallic sodium emulsion to form in the molten NaCl. Therefore, one option is to have a NaCl (42%) and CaCl_{2} (58%) mixture.

The anode reaction is:

2Cl^{−} → Cl_{2} (g) + 2e^{−}

The cathode reaction is:

2Na^{+} + 2e^{−} → 2Na (l)

for an overall reaction of

2Na^{+} + 2Cl^{−} → 2Na (l) + Cl_{2} (g)

As calcium has a lower reduction potential than sodium (-2.87 volts, compared to -2.38 volts for sodium), the calcium does not react, whilst the sodium ions are reduced. If the sodium ions were absent, calcium metal would be produced as the cathode product (which indeed is how metallic calcium is produced).

Both the products of the electrolysis, sodium metal and chlorine gas, are less dense than the electrolyte and therefore float to the surface. Perforated iron baffles are arranged in the cell to direct the products into separate chambers, preventing them from making contact.

Although theory predicts that a potential of a little over 4.07 volts should be sufficient to cause the reaction to go forward, in practice potentials of up to 8 volts are used to achieve useful current densities in the electrolyte despite its inherent electrical resistance. The overvoltage and consequent resistive heating also provides additional heat, helping to keep the electrolyte molten.

The Downs' process also produces chlorine as a byproduct, although chlorine produced this way accounts for only a small fraction of chlorine produced industrially by other methods.
