= Cyanometalate =

Class of coordination compounds with cyanide ligands (coordinating via C)

Cyanometallates, cyanometalates, cyanidometallates, or cyanidometalates are a class of coordination compounds, most often consisting only of cyanide ligands. Most are anions. Cyanide is a highly basic and small ligand, hence it readily saturates the coordination sphere of metal ions. The resulting cyanometallate anions are often used as building blocks for more complex structures called coordination polymers, the best known example of which is Prussian blue, a common dyestuff.

== Examples ==
=== Homoleptic cyanometallates ===
Homoleptic cyanometallates are complexes where the only ligand is cyanide. For transition metals, well known homoleptic cyanometallates are the hexacyanides. Hexacyanometalates are known for Ti(III), V(III), Cr(III), Cr(II), Mn(IV), Mn(III), Mn(II), Fe(II), Fe(III), Co(III), Ru(III), Ru(II), Os(III), and Os(II). Other more labile derivatives are also known. The Cr(II), Mn(III), Mn(II), Fe(II), Fe(III), and Co(III) derivatives are low-spin, reflecting the strong binding of cyanide, i.e. cyanide ranks highly in the spectrochemical series when significant backbonding can occur. Since cyanide has the largest σ-donation ability at its C-end, most soluble (molecular) metal-cyanide complexes have metal-carbon, rather than metal-nitrogen bonds. With low d-electron counts, however, inversion of cyanometallates to nitrile complexes can occur. Lower metal oxidation states can be achieved with binding of Lewis acids to the terminal nitrogen lone pairs.

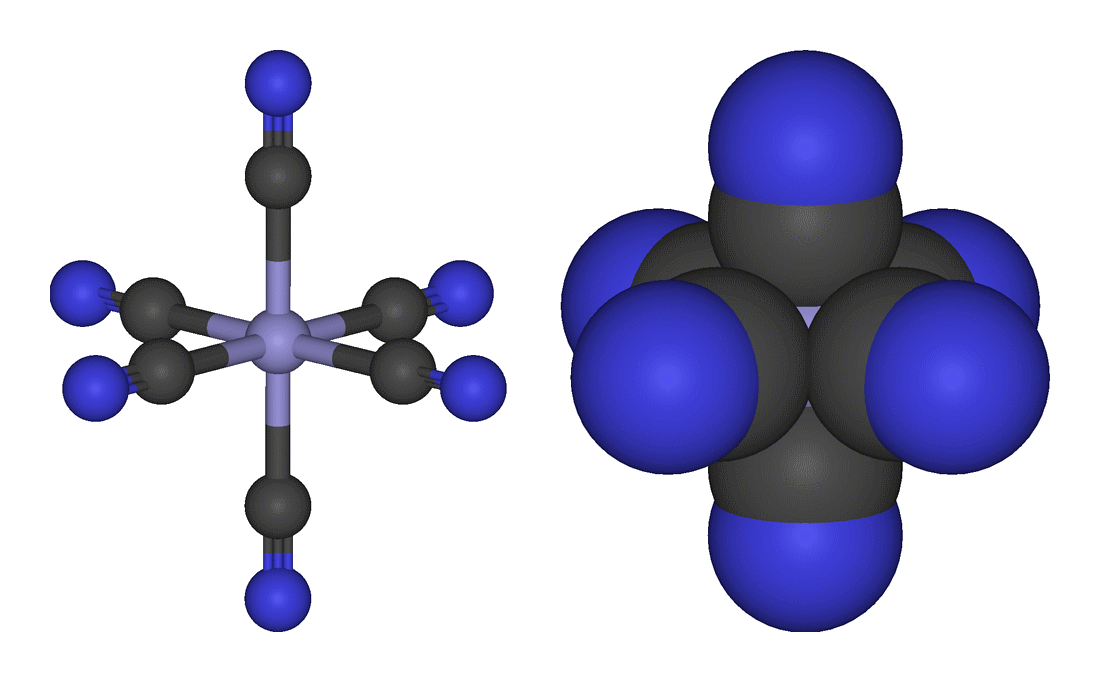

Pentacyanocobaltate ([Co(CN)_{5}]^{3−}) is produced by the addition of five or more equivalents of a cyanide to a solution of a cobalt(II) salt. It is square pyramidal. Solutions of [Co(CN)_{5}]^{−}_{3} undergo a variety of reactions, such as hydrogenation:

2[Co(CN)_{5}]^{3−} + H_{2} → 2 [Co(CN)_{5}H]^{3−}

Several tetracyanometalates are also known, the best known being those of the d^{8} metals, Ni(II), Pd(II), and Pt(II). These species are square-planar and diamagnetic. In addition to [Ni(CN)_{4}]^{4−}, nickel also forms [Ni_{2}(CN)_{6}]^{4-}, with a Ni(I)-Ni(I) bond. The coinage metals form stable dicyanometallates, [Cu(CN)_{2}]^{−}, [Ag(CN)_{2}]^{−}, and [Au(CN)_{2}]^{−}. For heavier metals, other stoichiometries are known such as K_{4}Mo(CN)_{8} and Potassium heptacyanorhenate. Some cyanometallates are clusters featuring metal-metal bonds, such as [Mo_{2}(CN)_{8}]^{4−}.

name	formula	formula weight	charge	oxidation state	comment	reference
Tetracyanidoborate	[B(CN)_{4}]^{−}		−1	+3		
Hexacyanidosilicate	[Si(CN)_{6}]^{2–}		−2	+4		
Tetracyanotitanate(II)	[Ti(CN)_{4}]^{2−}		−2	+2		
Hexacyanotitanate(III)	[Ti(CN)_{6}]^{3−}		−3	+3	orange	
Heptacyanotitanate(III)	[Ti(CN)_{7}]^{4−}		−4	+3		
Octacyanotitanate(III)	[Ti(CN)_{8}]^{5−}		−5	+3	dark green	
Hexacyanovanadate(II)	[V(CN)_{6}]^{4−}		−4	+2	yellow brown	
Heptacyanovanadate(III)	[V(CN)_{7}]^{4−}		−4	+3	scarlet purple	
Hexacyanidochromate(0)	[Cr(CN)_{6}]^{6−}		−6	0	dark green	
Hexacyanochromate(III)	[Cr(CN)_{6}]^{3−}		−3	+3	pale yellow	
Hexacyanomanganate(I)	[Mn(CN)_{6}]^{5–}		−5	+1	colorless	
Hexacyanomanganate(II)	[Mn(CN)_{6}]^{4–}		−4	+2		
Hexacyanomanganate(III)	[Mn(CN)_{6}]^{3–}		−3	+3		
Hexacyanomanganate(IV)	[Mn(CN)_{6}]^{2–}		−4	+4		
Hexacyanoferrate(II)	[Fe(CN)_{6}]^{4−}		−4	+2		
Hexacyanoferrate(III)	[Fe(CN)_{6}]^{3−}		−3	+3		
Tricyanidoferrate(−IV)	[Fe(CN)_{3}]^{7−}		−7	−4		
Tetracyanidoferrate(−II)	[Fe(CN)_{4}]^{6−}		−6	−2		
Tricyanocobaltate(−III)	[Co(CN)_{3}]^{6−}		−6	−3		
Hexacyanocobaltate(III)	[Co(CN)_{6}]^{3−}		−3	+3		
Tetracyanonickelate(0)	[Ni(CN)_{4}]^{4–}		−4	0		
Tetracyanonickelate(II)	[Ni(CN)_{4}]^{2–}		−2	+2	yellow orange	
Tetracyanonickelate(III)	[Ni(CN)_{4}]^{–}		−1	+3		
Hexacyanodinickelate(II)	[Ni_{2}(CN)_{6}]^{4−}		−4	+1		
Hexacyanogermanate(IV)	Ge(CN)_{6}^{2–}		−2	+4		
Heptacyanomolybdate(III)	[Mo(CN)_{7}]^{4−}		−4	+3	dark green	
Octacyanomolybdate(IV)	[Mo(CN)_{8}]^{4−}		−4	+4	yellow	
Tricyanidoruthenate(−IV)	[Ru(CN)_{3}]^{7−}		−7	−4		
Tetracyanopalladate(0)	[Pd(CN)_{4}]^{4–}		−4	0		
Tetracyanopalladate(II)	[Pd(CN)_{4}]^{2–}		−2	+2		
Dicyanidoargentate(I)	[Ag(CN)_{2}]^{–}		−1	+1		
Hexacyanostannate(II)	[Sn(CN)_{6}]^{2–}		−2	+4		
Pentacyanoantimonate	[Sb(CN)_{5}]^{2–}		−2	+3		
Heptacyanotungstate(IV)	[W(CN)_{7}]^{3−}		−3	+4		
Octacyanotungstate	[W(CN)_{8}]^{3−}		−3	+5		
Hexacyanorhenate(I)	[Re(CN)_{6}]^{5–}		−5	+1	green	
Heptacyanorhenate(IV)	[Re(CN)_{7}]^{3–}		−3	+4		
Tetracyanoplatinate(II)	[Pt(CN)_{4}]^{2−}		−2	+2		
Hexacyanoplatinate(IV)	[Pt(CN)_{6}]^{2–}		−2	+4		
Dicyanidoaurate(I)	[Au(CN)_{2}]^{–}		−1	+1		
Tetracyanidoaurate(III)	[Au(CN)_{4}]^{–}		−1	+3		
Pentacyanidobismuthate(III)	[Bi(CN)_{5}]^{2–}		−2	+3		
Hexacyanidobismuthate(III)	[Bi(CN)_{6}]^{3–}		−3	+3		
Hendecacyanodibismuthate	[Bi_{2}(CN)_{11}]^{5–}		−5	+3		

=== Heteroleptic cyanometallates ===
Mixed ligand cyanometallates with anywhere from one to five cyanide ligands have been prepared. One example is the zero-valent [Fe(CO)_{4}(CN)]^{−}. Heteroleptic cyanometallates are of interest outside of the research laboratory, with one example being the drug sodium nitroprusside (Na_{2}FeNO(CN)_{5}). Other studies have demonstrated their competency as photoredox catalysts.

== Synthesis ==
Because cyanide is a powerful nucleophile and a strong ligand, cyanometallates are generally prepared by the direct reaction of cyanide salts with simple metal salts. If other ligands are present on the metal, these are often displaced by cyanide. By far the largest application of cyanometalates is the production of [Au(CN)_{2}]^{−} in the extraction of gold from low grade ores. This conversion involves oxidation of metallic gold into Au^{+}:

4 Au + 8 CN^{−} + O_{2} + 2 H_{2}O → 4 [Au(CN)_{2}]^{−} + 4 OH^{−}

== Reactions ==
=== Redox ===
Because the M-CN bond is strong and delocalizes electron density to the ligands, several cyanometallates exhibit multiple redox states. A well known couple is [Fe(CN)_{6}]^{3−/4−}. Mn(IV), Mn(III), Mn(II), and Mn(I) are known for hexacyanomanganate. Few unidentate ligands allow similar redox transformations wherein both members of the redox couple are observable in solution. Another perhaps more dramatic example is the 2 e^{–} reduction of the square planar tetracyanonickelate to its tetrahedral Ni(0) derivative:

[Ni(CN)_{4}]^{2−} + 2 e^{–} → [Ni(CN)_{4}]^{4−}

=== N-Centered reactions ===
Many characteristic reactions of metal cyanides arise from ambidentate nature of cyanide, i.e. both the nitrogen and the carbon extremities of the anion are basic. Thus cyanometalates can be alkylated to give isocyanide complexes. Cyanide ligands are susceptible to protonation, hence many cyanometalates are highly solvatochromic. The nitrogen terminus is a good ligand for other metals. The latter tendency is illustrated by the condensation of ferrocyanide salts with other metal ions to give polymers, such as Prussian blue. Such polymers feature Fe-CN-M linkages.

== See also ==
- Transition metal nitrile complexes – coordination compounds containing nitrile ligands (coordinating via N)
