= Rubidium cyanide =

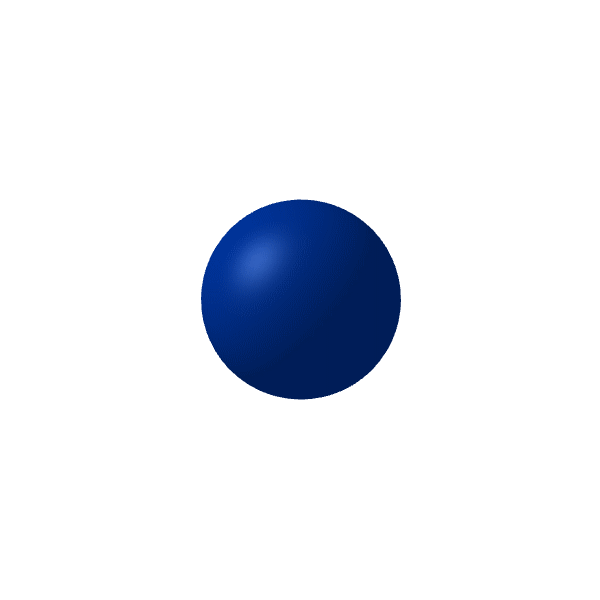

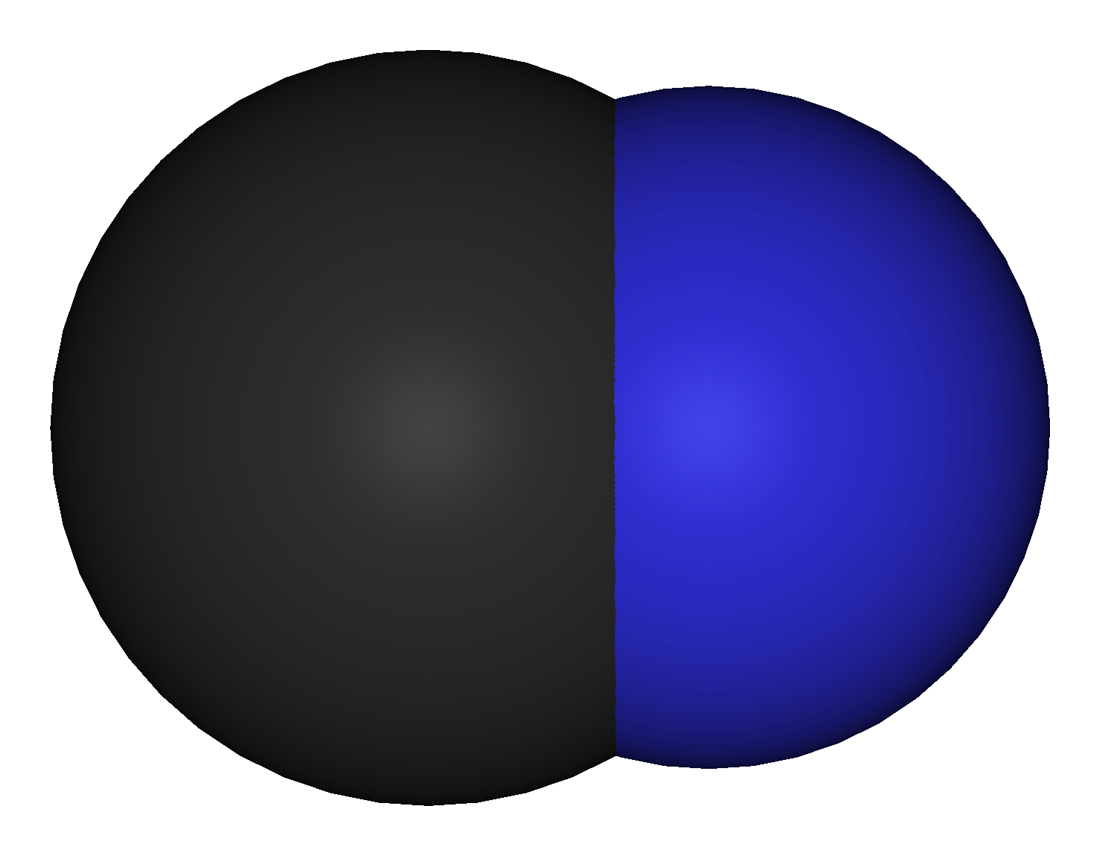

Names
- IUPAC name Rubidium cyanide

Identifiers
CAS Number	19073-56-4
3D model (JSmol)	Interactive image
ChemSpider	31044239
PubChem CID	23685983
CompTox Dashboard (EPA)	DTXSID50635609
- InChI: InChI=1S/CN.Rb/c1-2;/q-1;+1 Key: LVVHSFSKNVFYAG-UHFFFAOYSA-N
- SMILES: [C-]#N.[Rb+]

Properties
Chemical formula	CNRb
Molar mass	111.486 g·mol^{−1}
Appearance	White solid

Hazards
- Occupational safety and health (OHS/OSH)
Main hazards	Extremely toxic
NFPA 704 (fire diamond)	4 0 0
- Lethal dose or concentration (LD, LC)
LD_{50} (median dose)	5–10 mg/kg

Related compounds
Other cations	Lithium cyanide Sodium cyanide Potassium cyanide Caesium cyanide
- Except where otherwise noted, data are given for materials in their standard state (at 25 °C [77 °F], 100 kPa). Infobox references

Rubidium cyanide (chemical formula: RbCN) is the rubidium salt of hydrogen cyanide. It is a white solid, easily soluble in water, with a smell reminiscent of bitter almonds, and somewhat similar in appearance to sugar. Rubidium cyanide has chemical properties similar to potassium cyanide, and is similarly very toxic.

== Production ==
Rubidium cyanide can be synthesized by the reaction of hydrogen cyanide and rubidium hydroxide in alcohol or ether:

HCN + RbOH → RbCN + H_{2}O.
