= Cobalt(II) cyanide =

Names
- IUPAC name Cobalt(II) cyanide
- Other names cobaltous cyanide

Identifiers
| CAS Number | 542-84-7; 20427-11-6 (dihydrate); 26292-31-9 (trihydrate) |
| 3D model (JSmol) | Interactive image |
| ChemSpider | 61631 |
| ECHA InfoCard | 100.008.028 |
| PubChem CID | 68336 |
| UNII | 3300OC3VVZ |
| CompTox Dashboard (EPA) | DTXSID20969165 |
- InChI: InChI=1S/2CN.Co/c2*1-2;/q2*-1;+2 Key: CWZOMTYLSNXUEL-UHFFFAOYSA-N; InChI=1/2CN.Co/c2*1-2;/q2*-1;+2 Key: CWZOMTYLSNXUEL-UHFFFAOYAR
- SMILES: [Co+2].[C-]#N.[C-]#N

Properties
| Chemical formula | Co(CN)_{2} |
| Molar mass | 110.968 g/mol |
| Appearance | deep-blue powder hygroscopic |
| Density | 1.872 g/cm^{3} (anhydrous) |
| Melting point | 220 °C (428 °F; 493 K) (decomposes) |
| Solubility in water | insoluble |
| Solubility | dihydrate degraded with dissolution by NaCN, KCN, NH_{4}OH, HCl |
| Magnetic susceptibility (χ) | +3825·10^{−6} cm^{3}/mol |

Related compounds
| Other anions | Cadmium chloride, Cadmium iodide |
| Other cations | Zinc cyanide, Calcium cyanide, Magnesium cyanide |
- Except where otherwise noted, data are given for materials in their standard state (at 25 °C [77 °F], 100 kPa). verify (what is ?) Infobox references

Cobalt(II) cyanide is the inorganic compound with the empirical formula Co(CN)_{2} and structural formula Co_{3}[Co(CN)_{5}]_{2}. It is a coordination polymer that has attracted intermittent attention over many years in the areas of inorganic synthesis and homogeneous catalysis. The anhydrous and octahydrate forms are both blue solids insoluble in water.

== Preparation and structure ==
The octahydrate is prepared by the reaction between tetraethylammonium pentacyanocobaltate and cobalt(II) chloride:

2 (Et_{4}N)_{3}[Co(CN)_{5}] + 3 Co(H_{2}O)_{6}Cl_{2} → [Co(H_{2}O)_{6}]_{3}[Co(CN)_{5}]_{2} · 2H_{2}O↓ + 6 Et_{4}N^{+} + 6 Cl^{−}

Heating of the octahydrate at 100 °C produces the anhydrous form. The anhydrous form can also be prepared from the reaction of cobalt(II) bromide and potassium cyanide or sodium cyanide in liquid ammonia, then heating the resulting ammoniate to 210 °C in ethyl benzoate.

The structural formula Co_{3}[Co(CN)_{5}]_{2} shows that cobalt(II) cyanide consists of Co^{2+} and [Co(CN)_{5}]^{3–} (pentacyanocobaltate) ions, the latter of which also has cobalt in its +2 oxidation state.

=== Oxygenation and redox ===
A red trihydrated has also been reported, but this was later shown to be the oxygenated derivative containing the ion [Co(CN)_{5}(O_{2})]^{3–}.

The oxygenated derivative is obtained as a reddish-brown precipitate by adding two equivalents of potassium cyanide to a solution of cobalt(II) salts in air. With excess cyanide, the red-brown solid dissolves to give pentacyanocobaltate, which oxidizes in the presence of oxygen to hexacyanocobaltate(III).

== Uses ==
Cobalt(II) cyanide has been used as a precursor to dicobalt octacarbonyl.
