= Cyanide =

Any molecule with a cyano group (C≡N)

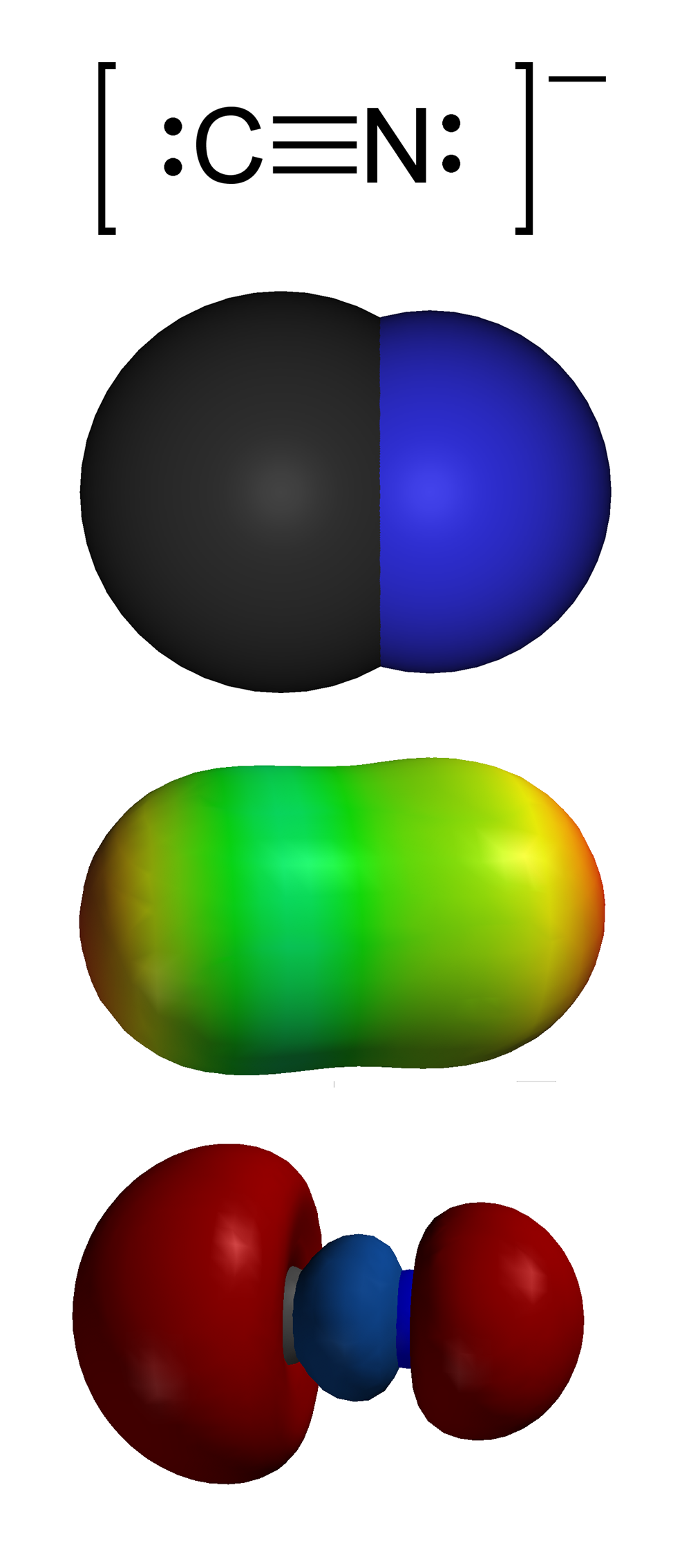

Names
- Systematic IUPAC name Nitridocarbonate(II)

Identifiers
CAS Number	57-12-5
3D model (JSmol)	Interactive image
ChEBI	CHEBI:17514
ChemSpider	5755
PubChem CID	5975
UNII	OXN4E7L11K
- InChI: InChI=1S/CN/c1-2/q-1 Key: XFXPMWWXUTWYJX-UHFFFAOYSA-N
- SMILES: [C-]#N

Properties
Chemical formula	CN^{−}
Molar mass	26.018 g·mol^{−1}
Conjugate acid	Hydrogen cyanide

Hazards
- Occupational safety and health (OHS/OSH)
Main hazards	The cyanide ion CN^{−} is one of the most poisonous chemicals. It may cause death in minutes.
- Except where otherwise noted, data are given for materials in their standard state (at 25 °C [77 °F], 100 kPa). Infobox references

In chemistry, a cyanide is an inorganic chemical compound that contains a C≡N functional group. This group, known as the cyano group, consists of a carbon atom triple-bonded to a nitrogen atom. The name, from Greek kyanos 'dark blue', comes from the compound's historical association with the Prussian dark blue pigment.

Ionic cyanides contain the cyanide anion ^{−}C≡N. This anion is extremely toxic and causes cyanide poisoning. Soluble cyanide salts such as sodium cyanide (NaCN), potassium cyanide (KCN) and tetraethylammonium cyanide ([(CH_{3}CH_{2})_{4}N]CN) are also highly toxic.

Covalent cyanides contain the −C≡N group, and are usually called nitriles if the group is linked by a single covalent bond to carbon atom. For example, in acetonitrile CH_{3}−C≡N, the cyanide group is bonded to methyl −CH_{3}. In tetracyanomethane C(−C≡N)_{4}, four cyano groups are bonded to carbon. Although nitriles generally do not release cyanide ions, the cyanohydrins do and are thus toxic. The cyano group may be covalently bonded to atoms other than carbon, e.g., in cyanogen azide N_{3}−C≡N, phosphorus tricyanide P(−C≡N)_{3} and trimethylsilyl cyanide (CH_{3})_{3}Si−C≡N.

Hydrogen cyanide, or H−C≡N, is a highly volatile toxic liquid that is produced on a large scale industrially. It is obtained by acidification of cyanide salts.

== Bonding ==
The cyanide ion ^{−}C≡N is isoelectronic with carbon monoxide ^{−}C≡O^{+} and with molecular nitrogen N≡N. A triple bond exists between C and N. The negative charge is concentrated on carbon C.

== Occurrence ==
=== In nature ===
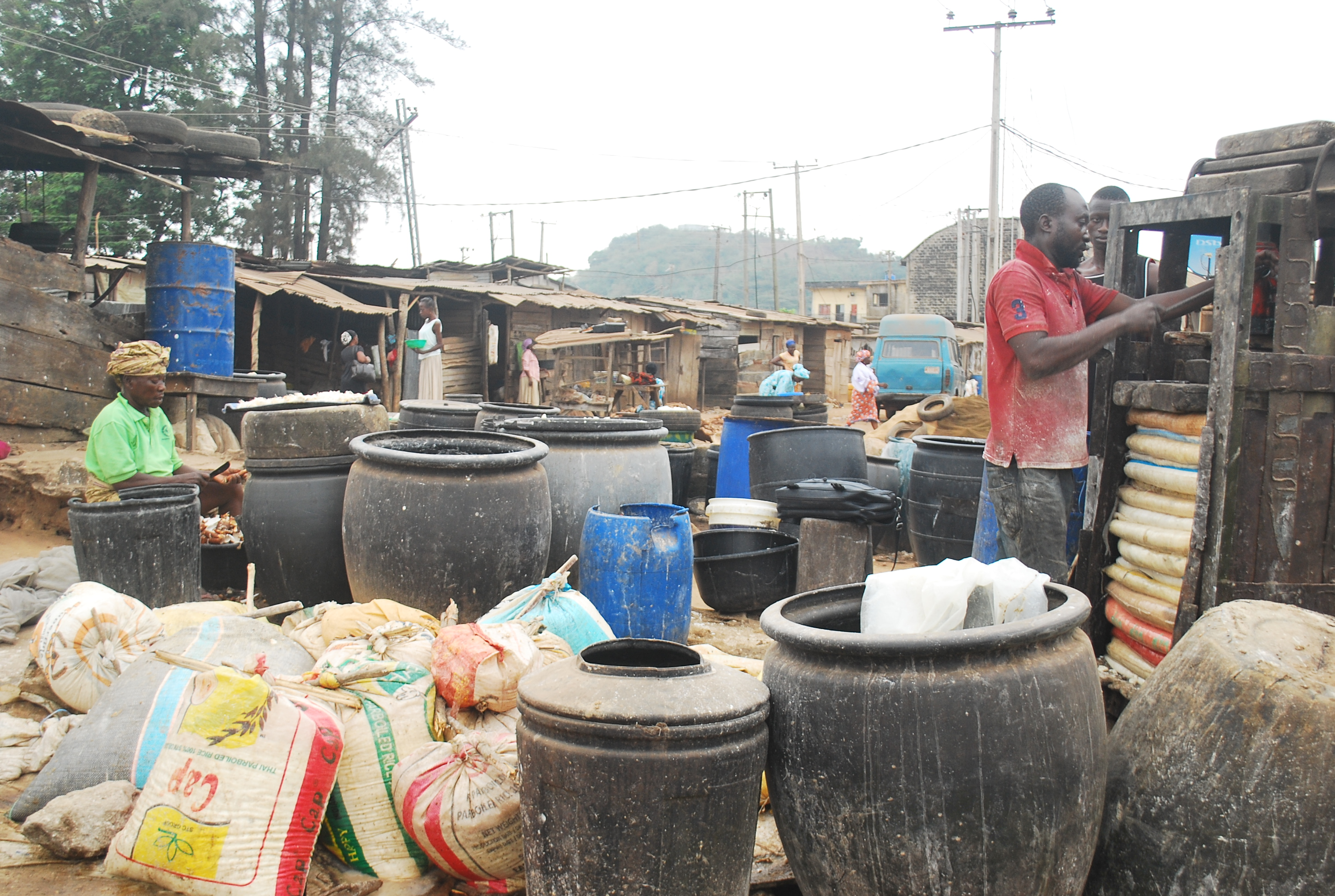
Removal of cyanide from cassava in Nigeria

Cyanides are produced by certain insects, bacteria, fungi, and algae. It is an antifeedant in a number of plants. Cyanides are found in substantial amounts in certain seeds and fruit stones, e.g., those of bitter almonds, apricots, apples, cherries, and peaches. Chemical compounds that can release cyanide are known as cyanogenic compounds. In plants, cyanides are usually bound to sugar molecules in the form of cyanogenic glycosides and defend the plant against herbivores. Cassava roots (also called manioc), an important potato-like food grown in tropical countries (and the base from which tapioca is made), also contain cyanogenic glycosides.

The Madagascar bamboo Cathariostachys madagascariensis produces cyanide as a deterrent to grazing. In response, the golden bamboo lemur, which eats the bamboo, has developed a high tolerance to cyanide.

The hydrogenase enzymes contain cyanide ligands attached to iron in their active sites. The biosynthesis of cyanide in the NiFe hydrogenases proceeds from carbamoyl phosphate, which converts to cysteinyl thiocyanate, the CN^{−} donor.

=== Interstellar medium ===
The cyanide radical ^{•}CN has been identified in interstellar space. Cyanogen, (CN)_{2}, is used to measure the temperature of interstellar gas clouds.

=== Pyrolysis and combustion product ===
Hydrogen cyanide is produced by the combustion or pyrolysis of certain materials under oxygen-deficient conditions. For example, it can be detected in the exhaust of internal combustion engines and tobacco smoke. Certain plastics, especially those derived from acrylonitrile, release hydrogen cyanide when heated or burnt.

=== Organic derivatives ===
In IUPAC nomenclature, organic compounds that have a −C≡N functional group are called nitriles. An example of a nitrile is acetonitrile, CH_{3}−C≡N. Nitriles usually do not release cyanide ions. A functional group with a hydroxyl −OH and cyanide −CN bonded to the same carbon atom is called cyanohydrin (R_{2}C(OH)CN). Unlike nitriles, cyanohydrins do release poisonous hydrogen cyanide.

== Reactions ==
=== Protonation ===
Cyanide is a base. The pK_{a} of hydrogen cyanide is 9.21. Thus, addition of acids stronger than hydrogen cyanide to solutions of cyanide salts releases hydrogen cyanide.

=== Hydrolysis ===
Cyanide is unstable in water, but the reaction is slow until about 170 °C. It undergoes hydrolysis to give ammonia and formate, which are far less toxic than cyanide:

CN^{−} + 2 H_{2}O → HCO^{−}_{2} + NH_{3}

Cyanide hydrolase is an enzyme that catalyzes this reaction.

=== Alkylation ===
Because of the cyanide anion's high nucleophilicity, cyano groups are readily introduced into organic molecules by displacement of a halide group (e.g., the chloride on methyl chloride). In general, organic cyanides are called nitriles. In organic synthesis, cyanide is a C-1 synthon; i.e., it can be used to lengthen a carbon chain by one, while retaining the ability to be functionalized.

RX + CN^{−} → RCN + X^{−}

=== Redox ===
The cyanide ion is a reductant and is oxidized by strong oxidizing agents such as molecular chlorine (Cl_{2}), hypochlorite (ClO^{−}), and hydrogen peroxide (H_{2}O_{2}). These oxidizers are used to destroy cyanides in effluents from gold mining.

=== Metal complexation ===
The cyanide anion reacts with transition metals to form M-CN bonds. This reaction is the basis of cyanide's toxicity. The high affinities of metals for this anion can be attributed to its negative charge, compactness, and ability to engage in π-bonding.

Among the most important cyanide coordination compounds are the potassium ferrocyanide and the pigment Prussian blue, which are both essentially nontoxic due to the tight binding of the cyanides to a central iron atom. Prussian blue was first accidentally made around 1706, by heating substances containing iron and carbon and nitrogen, and other cyanides made subsequently (and named after it). Among its many uses, Prussian blue gives the blue color to blueprints, bluing, and cyanotypes.

== Production ==
The principal process used to make cyanides is the Andrussow process in which gaseous hydrogen cyanide is produced from methane and ammonia in the presence of oxygen and a platinum catalyst.

2 CH_{4} + 2 NH_{3} + 3 O_{2} → 2 HCN + 6 H_{2}O

Sodium cyanide, the precursor to most cyanides, is produced by treating hydrogen cyanide with sodium hydroxide:

HCN + NaOH → NaCN + H_{2}O

== Toxicity ==
Among the most toxic cyanides are hydrogen cyanide (HCN), sodium cyanide (NaCN), potassium cyanide (KCN), and calcium cyanide (Ca(CN)_{2}). The cyanide anion is an inhibitor of the enzyme cytochrome c oxidase (also known as aa_{3}), the fourth complex of the electron transport chain found in the inner membrane of the mitochondria of eukaryotic cells. It attaches to the iron within this protein. The binding of cyanide to this enzyme prevents transport of electrons from cytochrome c to oxygen. As a result, the electron transport chain is disrupted, meaning that the cell can no longer aerobically produce ATP for energy. Tissues that depend highly on aerobic respiration, such as the central nervous system and the heart, are particularly affected. This is an example of histotoxic hypoxia.

Hydrogen cyanide, which is a gas, kills by inhalation. For this reason, working with hydrogen cyanide requires wearing an air respirator supplied by an external oxygen source. Hydrogen cyanide can be produced by adding acid to a solution containing a cyanide salt. Alkaline solutions of cyanide are safer to use because they do not evolve hydrogen cyanide gas. Oral ingestion of a small quantity of solid cyanide or a cyanide solution of as little as 200 mg, or exposure to airborne cyanide of 270 ppm, is sufficient to cause death within minutes.

Organic nitriles do not readily release cyanide ions, and so have low toxicities.

=== Disposal ===
Due to toxicity considerations, the disposal of cyanide is subject to stringent regulations. Industrial cyanide effluent is typically destroyed by oxidation using peroxysulfuric acid, hydrogen peroxide, sulfur dioxide/copper salts ("Inco process") or all three ("Combiox process"). Use of sodium hypochlorite, traditional for laboratory-scale wastes, is impractical on a commercial scale. Hydrolysis at higher temperatures is highly effective, but requires specialized equipment. Lastly, cyanide wastes can be acidified for recovery of hydrogen cyanide.

=== Antidote ===
Hydroxocobalamin reacts with cyanide to form cyanocobalamin, which can be safely eliminated by the kidneys. This method has the advantage of avoiding the formation of methemoglobin (see below). This antidote kit is sold under the brand name Cyanokit and was approved by the U.S. FDA in 2006.

An older cyanide antidote kit included administration of three substances: amyl nitrite pearls (administered by inhalation), sodium nitrite, and sodium thiosulfate. The goal of the antidote was to generate a large pool of ferric iron (Fe^{3+}) to compete for cyanide with cytochrome a_{3} (so that cyanide will bind to the antidote rather than the enzyme). The nitrites oxidize hemoglobin to methemoglobin, which competes with cytochrome oxidase for the cyanide ion. Cyanmethemoglobin is formed and the cytochrome oxidase enzyme is restored. The major mechanism to remove the cyanide from the body is by enzymatic conversion to thiocyanate by the mitochondrial enzyme rhodanese. Thiocyanate is a relatively non-toxic molecule and is excreted by the kidneys. To accelerate this detoxification, sodium thiosulfate is administered to provide a sulfur donor for rhodanese, needed in order to produce thiocyanate.

=== Sensitivity ===
Minimum risk levels (MRLs) may not protect for delayed health effects or health effects acquired following repeated sublethal exposure, such as hypersensitivity, asthma, or bronchitis. MRLs may be revised after sufficient data accumulates.

== Applications ==
=== Mining ===
Cyanide is mainly produced for the mining of silver and gold: It helps dissolve these metals allowing separation from the other solids. In the cyanide process, finely ground high-grade ore is mixed with the cyanide (at a ratio of about 1:500 parts NaCN to ore); low-grade ores are stacked into heaps and sprayed with a cyanide solution (at a ratio of about 1:1000 parts NaCN to ore). The precious metals are complexed by the cyanide anions to form soluble derivatives, e.g., [Ag(CN)_{2}]^{−} (dicyanoargentate(I)) and [Au(CN)_{2}]^{−} (dicyanoaurate(I)). Silver is less "noble" than gold and often occurs as the sulfide, in which case redox is not invoked (no O_{2} is required). Instead, a displacement reaction occurs:

Ag_{2}S + 4 NaCN + H_{2}O → 2 Na[Ag(CN)_{2}] + NaSH + NaOH
4 Au + 8 NaCN + O_{2} + 2 H_{2}O → 4 Na[Au(CN)_{2}] + 4 NaOH

The "pregnant liquor" containing these ions is separated from the solids, which are discarded to a tailing pond or spent heap, the recoverable gold having been removed. The metal is recovered from the "pregnant solution" by reduction with zinc dust or by adsorption onto activated carbon. This process can result in environmental and health problems. A number of environmental disasters have followed the overflow of tailing ponds at gold mines. Cyanide contamination of waterways has resulted in numerous cases of human and aquatic species mortality.

Aqueous cyanide is hydrolyzed rapidly, especially in sunlight. It can mobilize some heavy metals such as mercury if present. Gold can also be associated with arsenopyrite (FeAsS), which is similar to iron pyrite (fool's gold), wherein half of the sulfur atoms are replaced by arsenic. Gold-containing arsenopyrite ores are similarly reactive toward inorganic cyanide.

=== Industrial organic chemistry ===
The second major application of alkali metal cyanides (after mining) is in the production of CN-containing compounds, usually nitriles. Acyl cyanides are produced from acyl chlorides and cyanide. Cyanogen, cyanogen chloride, and the trimer cyanuric chloride are derived from alkali metal cyanides.

=== Medical uses ===
The cyanide compound sodium nitroprusside is used mainly in clinical chemistry to measure urine ketone bodies mainly as a follow-up to diabetic patients. On occasion, it is used in emergency medical situations to produce a rapid decrease in blood pressure in humans; it is also used as a vasodilator in vascular research. The cobalt in artificial vitamin B_{12} contains a cyanide ligand as an artifact of the purification process; this must be removed by the body before the vitamin molecule can be activated for biochemical use. During World War I, a copper cyanide compound was briefly used by Japanese physicians for the treatment of tuberculosis and leprosy.

=== Illegal fishing and poaching ===
Cyanides are illegally used to capture live fish near coral reefs for the aquarium and seafood markets. The practice is controversial, dangerous, and damaging but is driven by the lucrative exotic fish market.

Poachers in Africa have been known to use cyanide to poison waterholes, to kill elephants for their ivory.

=== Pest control ===
M44 cyanide devices are used in the United States to kill coyotes and other canids. Cyanide is also used for pest control in New Zealand, particularly for possums, an introduced marsupial that threatens the conservation of native species and spreads tuberculosis amongst cattle. Possums can become bait shy but the use of pellets containing the cyanide reduces bait shyness. Cyanide has been known to kill native birds, including the endangered kiwi. Cyanide is also effective for controlling the dama wallaby, another introduced marsupial pest in New Zealand. A licence is required to store, handle and use cyanide in New Zealand.

Cyanides are used as insecticides for fumigating ships. Cyanide salts are used for killing ants, and have in some places been used as rat poison (the less toxic poison arsenic is more common).

=== Niche uses ===
Potassium ferrocyanide is used to achieve a blue color on cast bronze sculptures during the final finishing stage of the sculpture. On its own, it will produce a very dark shade of blue and is often mixed with other chemicals to achieve the desired tint and hue. It is applied using a torch and paint brush while wearing the standard safety equipment used for any patina application: rubber gloves, safety glasses, and a respirator. The actual amount of cyanide in the mixture varies according to the recipes used by each foundry.

Cyanide is used in jewelry-making and certain kinds of photography such as sepia toning.

Although usually thought to be toxic, cyanide and cyanohydrins increase germination in various plant species.

==== Human poisoning ====
Deliberate cyanide poisoning of humans has occurred many times throughout history. Common salts such as sodium cyanide are involatile but water-soluble, so are poisonous by ingestion. Hydrogen cyanide is a gas, making it more indiscriminately dangerous, however it is lighter than air and rapidly disperses up into the atmosphere, which makes it ineffective as a chemical weapon.

==== Food additive ====
Because of the high stability of their complexation with iron, ferrocyanides (Sodium ferrocyanide E535, Potassium ferrocyanide E536, and Calcium ferrocyanide E538) do not decompose to lethal levels in the human body and are used in the food industry as, e.g., an anticaking agent in table salt.

== Chemical tests for cyanide ==
Cyanide is quantified by potentiometric titration, a method widely used in gold mining. It can also be determined by titration with silver ion. Some analyses begin with an air-purge of an acidified boiling solution, sweeping the vapors into a basic absorber solution. The cyanide salt absorbed in the basic solution is then analyzed.

=== Qualitative tests ===
Because of the toxicity of cyanide, many methods for detecting it have been investigated. Benzidine gives a blue coloration in the presence of ferricyanide. Iron(II) sulfate added to a solution of cyanide, such as the filtrate from the sodium fusion test, gives prussian blue. A solution of para-benzoquinone in DMSO reacts with inorganic cyanide to form a cyanophenol, which is fluorescent. Illumination with a UV light gives a green/blue glow if the test is positive.
