= Caesium cyanide =

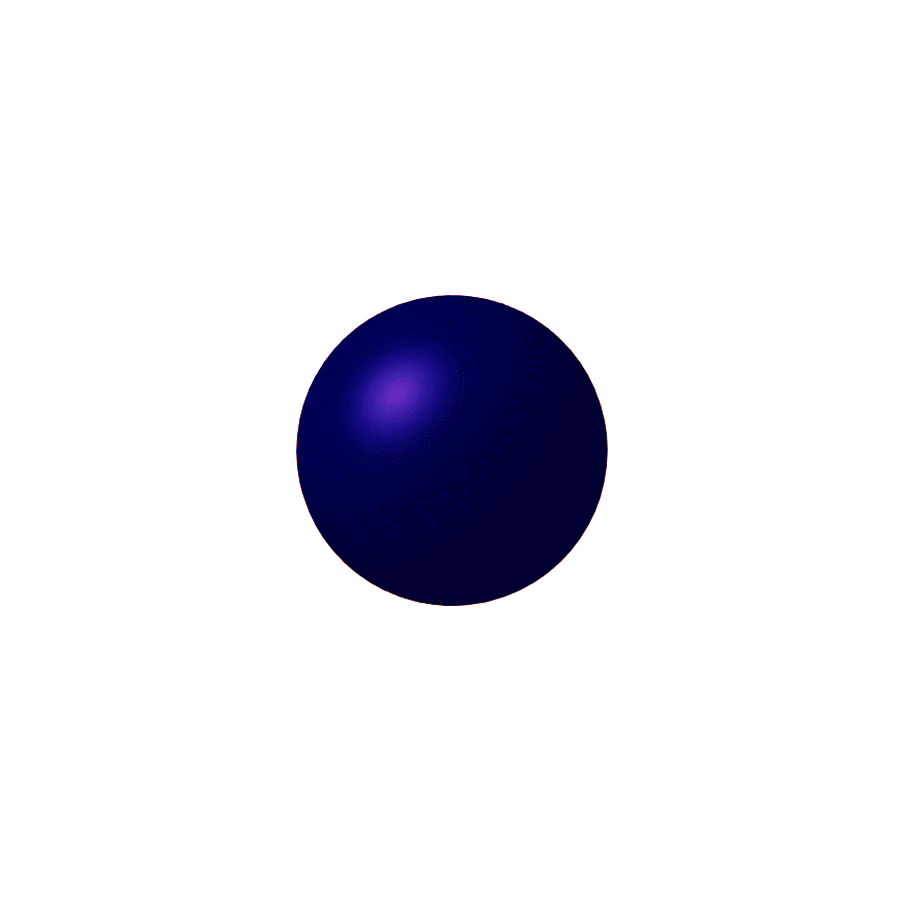

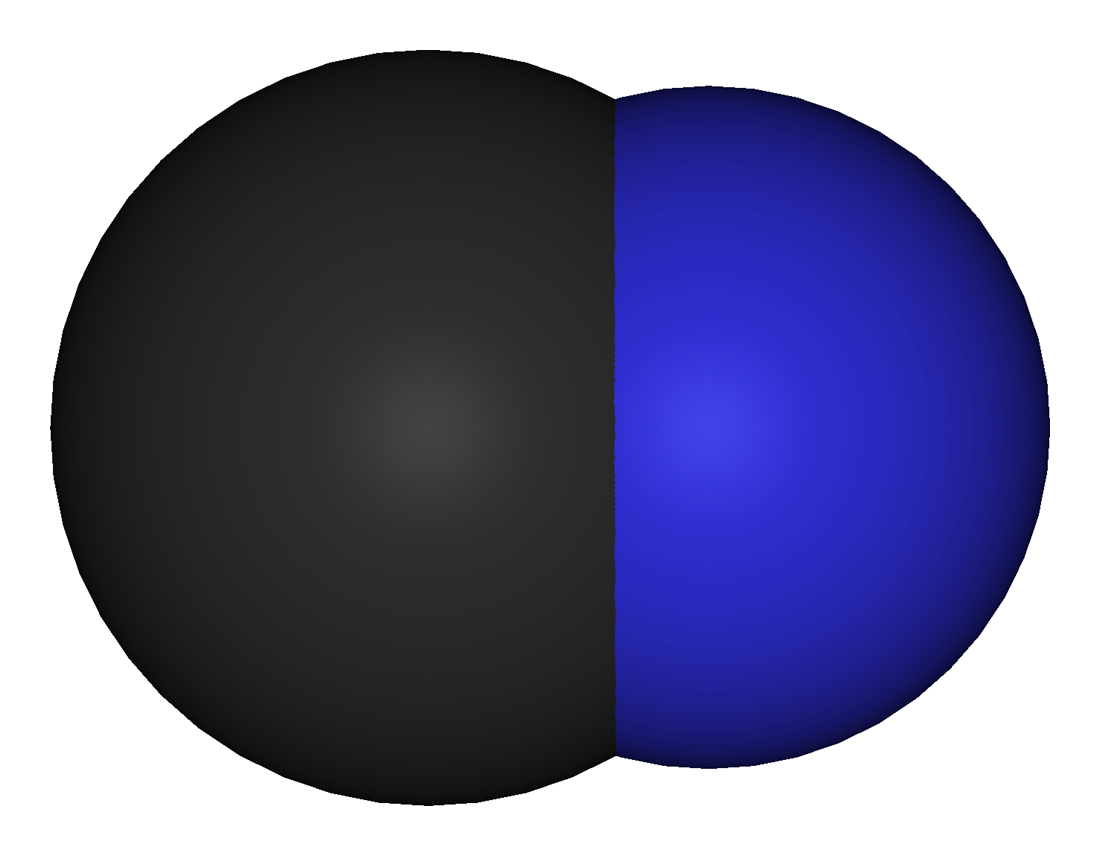

Names
- IUPAC name Caesium cyanide
- Other names Cesium cyanide

Identifiers
CAS Number	21159-32-0
3D model (JSmol)	Interactive image
ChemSpider	67139952
PubChem CID	101925428
- InChI: InChI=1S/CN.Cs/c1-2;/q-1;+1 Key: XTCPEYCUFMHXBI-UHFFFAOYSA-N
- SMILES: [C-]#N.[Cs+]

Properties
Chemical formula	CCsN
Molar mass	158.923 g·mol^{−1}
Appearance	White solid
Melting point	350 °C (662 °F; 623 K)

Hazards
- Occupational safety and health (OHS/OSH)
Main hazards	Extremely toxic
NFPA 704 (fire diamond)	4 0 0
- Lethal dose or concentration (LD, LC)
LD_{50} (median dose)	5 mg/kg

Related compounds
Other cations	Lithium cyanide Sodium cyanide Potassium cyanide Rubidium cyanide Ammonium cyanide
- Except where otherwise noted, data are given for materials in their standard state (at 25 °C [77 °F], 100 kPa). Infobox references

Caesium cyanide (chemical formula: CsCN) is the caesium salt of hydrogen cyanide. It is a white solid, easily soluble in water, with a smell reminiscent of bitter almonds, and with crystals similar in appearance to sugar. Caesium cyanide has chemical properties similar to potassium cyanide and is very toxic.

== Production ==
Hydrogen cyanide reacts with caesium hydroxide giving caesium cyanide and water:

HCN + CsOH → CsCN + H_{2}O
