= Potassium octacyanomolybdate(IV) =

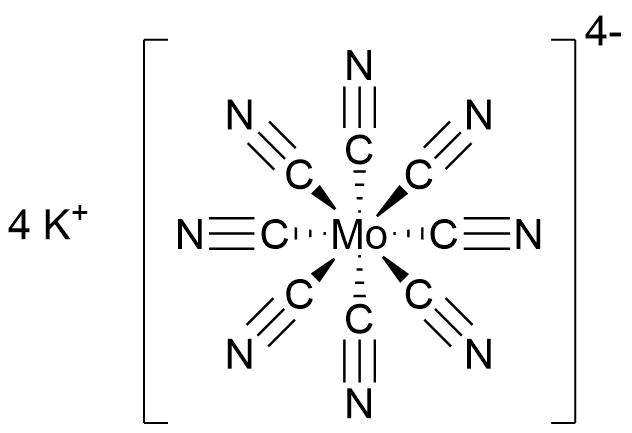

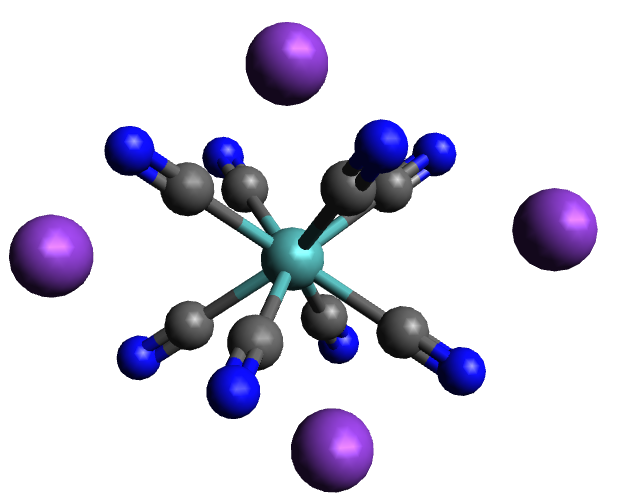

Names
- IUPAC name Potassium octacyanidomolybdate(IV)
- Other names Potassium octacyanomolybdate(IV)

Identifiers
CAS Number	anhydrous: 17456-18-7; dihydrate: 17457-89-5
3D model (JSmol)	anhydrous: Interactive image; monohydrate: Interactive image; dihydrate: Interactive image
PubChem CID	monohydrate: 71308809; dihydrate: 165360158
CompTox Dashboard (EPA)	dihydrate: DTXSID901336495
- InChI: monohydrate: InChI=1S/8CN.4K.Mo.H2O/c8*1-2;;;;;;/h;;;;;;;;;;;;;1H2/q8*-1;4*+1;+4; Key: JJVZTQPHXSHIOV-UHFFFAOYSA-N; dihydrate: InChI=1S/8CN.4K.Mo.2H2O/c8*1-2;;;;;;;/h;;;;;;;;;;;;;2*1H2/q8*-1;4*+1;+4;; Key: GRZGTFZNVZNYOQ-UHFFFAOYSA-N
- SMILES: anhydrous: [K+].[K+].[K+].[K+].N#C[Mo-4](C#N)(C#N)(C#N)(C#N)(C#N)(C#N)C#N; monohydrate: O.O.[K+].[K+].[K+].[K+].N#C[Mo-4](C#N)(C#N)(C#N)(C#N)(C#N)(C#N)C#N; dihydrate: [C-]#N.[C-]#N.[C-]#N.[C-]#N.[C-]#N.[C-]#N.[C-]#N.[C-]#N.O.O.[K+].[K+].[K+].[K+].[Mo+4]

Properties
Chemical formula	K_{4}[Mo(CN)_{8}]
Molar mass	460,47 g/mol (anhydrous); 496.5 g/mol (dihydrate)
Appearance	yellow powder
Melting point	>300 °C

Hazards
- GHS labelling
Pictograms	(GHS07: Exclamation mark)
Signal word	Warning
Hazard statements	H302, H315, H319, H335
Precautionary statements	P261, P305+P351+P338
- Except where otherwise noted, data are given for materials in their standard state (at 25 °C [77 °F], 100 kPa). Infobox references

Potassium octacyanomolybdate(IV) is the inorganic salt with the formula K_{4}[Mo(CN)_{8}]. A yellow light-sensitive solid, it is the potassium salt of the cyanometalate with the coordination number eight. The complex anion consists of a Mo(IV) center bound to eight cyanide ligands resulting in an overall charge of −4, which is balanced with four potassium cations. The salt is often prepared as its dihydrate K_{4}[Mo(CN)_{8}]^{.}(H_{2}O)_{2}.

== Preparation ==
The dihydrate K_{4}[Mo(CN)_{8}] · 2 H_{2}O can be prepared by the reduction of molybdate (MoO_{4}^{2-}) with potassium borohydride (KBH_{4}) in a solution with potassium cyanide and acetic acid. Yields of 70% are typical and the method is suited for scale-up.

4 MoO_{4}^{2-} + 32 CN^{−} + BH_{4}^{−} + 25 H^{+} → 4 [Mo(CN)_{8}]^{4-} + 13 H_{2}O + H_{3}BO_{3}

An alternative route starts from MoCl_{4}(Et_{2}O)_{2} avoiding the need for reductants. The yield of this route is typically around 70%. This synthesis is convenient for lower batch sizes than the earlier method but the MoCl_{4}(Et_{2}O)_{2} is typically less available than the molybdate.

MoCl_{4}(Et_{2}O)_{2} + 8 KCN → K_{4}[Mo(CN)_{8}] + 4 KCl + 2 Et_{2}O

== Reactions ==
Octacyanomolybdate(IV) can be oxidized to the paramagnetic octacyanomolybdate(V).

The cyanide ligands in [Mo(CN)_{8}]^{4-} remain basic. Strong acids lead to the hydrogen isocyanide complex [Mo(CNH)_{8}]^{4+}, in common with many cyanometalate complexes. These ligands can be substituted by others, for example H_{2}O. The cyanide ligands also bind to other metals, leading to cages.
