= Jack Halpern (chemist) =

Inorganic chemist (1925–2018)

Jack Halpern (19 January 1925 – 31 January 2018) was an inorganic chemist, the Louis Block Distinguished Service Professor of Chemistry at the University of Chicago. Born in Poland, he moved to Canada in 1929 and the United States in 1962.

His research focused on mechanistic organometallic chemistry, especially homogeneous catalysis, beginning with early work on the activation of hydrogen by soluble complexes. He contributed to elucidation of the mechanism of the hydrogenation of alkenes by Wilkinson's catalyst and the stereodetermining step in certain asymmetric hydrogenation processes. Related areas of interest include the reactivity of metal-carbon bonds, e.g., in cobalamins and pentacyanocobaltate derivatives.

He was elected a Fellow of the Royal Society in 1974. From the American Chemical Society he won the Willard Gibbs Award (1986), and awards for Inorganic Chemistry, Organometallic Chemistry, and the Distinguished Service in Inorganic Chemistry, the latter in partial recognition of his editorship of the Journal of the American Chemical Society.
