= M44 (cyanide device) =

Animal pest killer

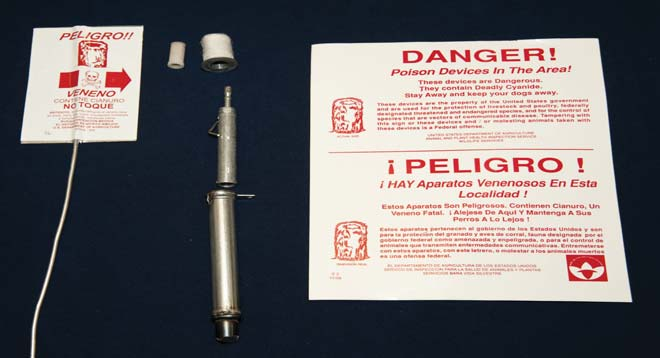
The M-44 consists of a capsule holder, a cyanide capsule, a spring-activated ejector, and a stake. Bilingual signs warn about the device.

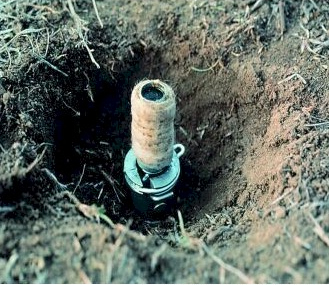
When the trap is set, only the capsule holder and capsule protrude above ground level.

The M44 cyanide device (also called a cyanide gun, cyanide trap, or canid pest ejector) is used to kill coyotes, feral dogs, and foxes. It is made from four parts: a capsule holder wrapped with cloth or other soft material, a small plastic capsule containing 0.88 grams of sodium cyanide, a spring-powered ejector, and a 5–7 inches (130–180 mm) stake. To install the trap, the stake is first driven down into the ground, and then the capsule is put in the holder, screwed onto the cocked ejector, and secured to the stake. The wrapped capsule holder is smeared with scented bait to attract coyotes and make them bite and pull on it. (The use of a bite-and-pull action makes the trap less likely to be set off by non-canine wildlife.) When the trap is triggered, the spring propels a dose of sodium cyanide into the animal's mouth, where it combines with saliva to produce hydrogen cyanide gas. In addition to the cyanide, the capsule contains a brightly colored particle marker (orange in capsules used by the Wildlife Services, and yellow in capsules prepared for other users).

== Development and history ==
The M44 was invented in the 1960s to replace a similar device known as a 'Coyote Getter', which had been in use since the 1930s. The Coyote Getter used a .38 Special pistol cartridge case to contain the sodium cyanide mixture, and ejected the cyanide with a primer. The wad and cyanide were ejected with great force and could be quite hazardous. For example, in 1959 a 15-year-old boy lost one eye when he accidentally set off a Coyote Getter by stepping on it. In 1966 a man was hit in the left hand and died from cyanide poisoning, and between 1965 and 1971 at least 17 humans were injured by Coyote Getters. In the early 1960s the Fish and Wildlife Service started to develop a safer, spring-loaded replacement device. Much of the work was done by James Poteet, a predator control specialist in Midland, Texas, who received a patent for the device in 1967. The new device was gradually phased into federal management programs beginning in 1967, and by November 1970 it had substantially replaced the Coyote Getter.

Since its introduction, the M44 design has been updated several times to solve problems such as caking in the cyanide capsules and malfunctioning ejectors. One effort between 1977 and 1979 resulted in a completely new, slightly larger cyanide ejector called the M50. A field evaluation in 1982 showed that the older Poteet-designed M44 actually performed better, and the M50 was phased out. In 1984, the M44 ejector body and capsule holder were redesigned when it became necessary to replace the dies that had been used since 1967 to cast those metal parts. That model is still produced, with some adjustments.

In 2023, the Biden administration banned the use of the M-44 on BLM land. In May 2026, the Trump administration re-introduced the M-44.

== Use against canines ==
The M44 is in frequent use by the USDA Wildlife Services in their programs to eliminate coyotes. For example, in 2016, out of the 76,963 coyotes that Wildlife Services killed, the M44 was used to kill 12,511 of them (16%). State agencies in South Dakota, Montana, Wyoming, New Mexico and Texas also use the device.

More recently, M44 devices have begun to be used in Australia to control foxes and wild dogs. There they are loaded with sodium fluoroacetate (also known as 1080 poison) or PAPP (4'-aminopropiophenone) instead of sodium cyanide, and are called 'Canid Pest Ejectors'. The NSW National Parks and Wildlife Service carried out trials from 2005 to 2011, and in 2016 they were approved for general use. The mechanical devices and lure heads are sold freely, but because the toxin capsules contain a regulated poison they require the purchaser to have a state permit.

== Criticism ==
Use of the M44 device has been criticized by animal welfare and environmental groups because there are many unintended victims including pets and endangered species, indicating a lack of selectivity, rather than the intended high specificity. In 2003, Dennis Slaugh of Vernal, Utah, was on public lands and mistook an M44 for a survey marker. When he pulled on it, the device shot sodium cyanide powder on his face and chest causing him to become violently ill. In February 2006, an M44 device killed a man's dog in Utah, as the dog and owner were walking through public land. The man was also affected by the cyanide in the device, and sought compensation from the US Department of Agriculture's Wildlife Service, along with the Utah Department of Food and Agriculture. In 2012 a family dog was killed in Texas. Between 2013 and 2016, M44 devices killed 22 pets and livestock animals. In 2017 a 14-year-old boy in Idaho was injured, and his dog killed, by an M44 placed less than 300 feet (91 m) from his home. On April 11, 2017, a month after the boy in Idaho was injured, the US Department of Agriculture announced that it would be ending the use of the device in Idaho indefinitely.

In August 2017, WildEarth Guardians submitted a petition to the Environmental Protection Agency (EPA) requesting that it prohibit use of sodium cyanide devices. During the public comment period WildEarth Guardians and the Center for Biological Diversity organized a write-in campaign and the EPA received more than 20,000 letters from the public against the devices. In an interim decision in June 2019, the EPA decided to keep the M44 devices approved (noting that without them, producers of sheep, goats, and cattle would likely incur higher costs and/or more livestock loss), but added some restrictions on use near public roads or private land.
