= Tetracyanoborate =

Names
- IUPAC name Tetrakis(cyano-kappaC)borate(1-)

Identifiers
3D model (JSmol)	Interactive image
ChemSpider	8210382
- InChI: InChI=1S/C4BN4/c6-1-5(2-7,3-8)4-9/q-1 Key: KDCFMDHINPOTEA-UHFFFAOYSA-N
- SMILES: N#C[B-](C#N)(C#N)C#N

Properties
Chemical formula	C_{4}BN_{4}^{−}
Molar mass	114.88 g·mol^{−1}
- Except where otherwise noted, data are given for materials in their standard state (at 25 °C [77 °F], 100 kPa). Infobox references

Tetracyanoborate (tetracyanidoborate or tetracyanoboranuide) is an anion or salt of this anion. It has four cyano groups attached to a central boron atom. The formula is [B(CN)_{4}]^{−}.

The anion is weakly coordinating and stable in conjunction with the hydronium ion H_{3}O^{+}.

Tetracyanoborate can form ionic liquids with unsymmetrical quaternary nitrogen cyclic cations. These are under investigation as carbon dioxide absorbers for use in carbon capture and storage. They are also used as electrolytes in supercapacitors and electric batteries.

Tetracyanoborate compounds were first made by Eduard Bernhardt and team in 2000 after previous failed attempts in the 1950s.

== Production ==
Tetrabutylammonium bromide can react with boron trihalides and potassium cyanide to yield tetrabutylammonium tetracyanoborate.

Tetrafluoroborate salts can react with Me_{3}SiCN when catalysed with Lewis acids to substitute fluoride with cyanide yielding tetracyanoborates.

Hydrogen tetracyanoborate can react with metal oxides or hydroxides to yield tetracyanoborate salts.

Potassium tetracyanoborate can react in a metastases with another metal salt to yield insoluble tetracyanoborates.

A low cost generation route is to use potassium fluoroborate with excess lithium chloride and potassium cyanide with a metal hydroxide.

== Related ions ==
The related hexacyanodiborane(6) dianion [B_{2}(CN)_{6}]^{2−} has a boron to boron bond, and forms salts.

The tricyanoborate dianion B(CN)_{3}^{2−} can be used to generate various other substituted tricyanoborate ions.

The tetrakis(trifluoromethyl)borate anion, [B(CF3)4]^{-} is also weakly coordinating and stable.

== List ==
name	formula	crystal	space group	unit cell	volume	density	comment	reference
lithium tetracyanoborate	Li[B(CN)_{4}]	cubic	P4̅3m	a = 5.4815 Z = 1	164.702	1.228	colourless; zero thermal expansion	
bis(12-crown-4)-lithium tetracyanidoborate	[Li(C_{8}H_{16}O_{4})_{2}][B(CN)_{4}]	orthorhombic	Pnna	a=10.9239 b=20.2493 c=11.3254				
(μ_{2}- tetracyanidoborate)-(15-crown-5)-lithium	[Li(C_{10}H_{20}O_{5})][B(CN)_{4}]	monoclinic	P2_{1}/c	a=15.8412 b=16.1149 c=16.3793 β=116.468°				
	Ph_{3}C^{+}[B(CN)_{4}]^{−}							
ammonium tetracyanoborate	[NH_{4}][B(CN)_{4}]	tetragonal	I4_{1}/a	a = 7.132 c = 14.745 Z = 4	750.0	1.177	colourless	
	[NH_{4}][B(CN)_{4}]·THF	orthorhombic	Pnma	a = 8.831 b = 9.366 c = 15.061 Z = 4	1245.7	1.093	colourless	
	[CH_{3}NH_{3}][B(CN)_{4}]	monoclinic	P2_{1}/c	a=7.5865 b=16.504 c=6.5100 β=93.512°				
N-methylmethanaminium tetrakis(cyano)borate	[(CH_{3})_{2}NH_{2}][B(CN)_{4}]	tetragonal	I4_{1}/acd	a=12.8185 c=24.269 Z=16	3987.7	1.073	melt 129 °C	
tetrabutylammonium tetracyanoborate	[Bu_{4}N][B(CN)_{4}]	orthorhombic	Pnma	a = 17.765 b = 11.650 c = 11.454 Z = 4	2370.5		colourless; melt 316.2K	
1-ethyl-3 methylimidazolium tetracyanoborate				liquid				
1-hexyl-3-methylimidazolium tetracyanoborate				liquid				
1-butyl-2-methyl-3-methylimidazolinium tetracyanoborate				liquid				
1-butyl-1-methylpyrolidinium tetracyanoborate	[BMPyr][B(CN)_{4}]			liquid				
1-butyl-1-methylpiperidinium tetracyanoborate				liquid				
1-pentyl-1-methylpyrolidinium tetracyanoborate				liquid				
spiro-(1,1′)-bipyrrolidinium tetracyanoborate							Organic ionic plastic crystal>−55 °C; mp 242 °C	
4-(pyridin-4-yl)pyridin-1-ium tetrakis(cyano)borate		monoclinic	P2_{1}/c	a=8.3394 b=9.7679 c=17.6562 β=96.127° Z=4	1430.0	1.264	melt 214 °C	
N-benzyl-N,N-dibutylbutan-1-aminium tetrakis(cyano)borate		orthorhombic	Pna2_{1}	a=18.8990 b=15.6383 c=8.4712 Z=8	2136.8	1.212	melt 59 °C	
(S)-Alanine ethyl ester tetracyanidoborate	(C_{5}H_{12}NO)[B(CN)_{4}]	monoclinic	C2	a=17.059 b=8.7467 c=18.855 β=111.468° Z=8	2618.2		melt 110 °C; colourless	
Pyridinium tetracyano-borate		orthorhombic	Pbca	a=13.200 b=7.600 c=21.300 Z=4	2503.7	1.038	melt 137 °C	
tetrabutulphosphonium tetracyanoborate	^{n}Bu_{4}P[B(CN)_{4}]						melt 316.2K	
tetraphenylphosphonium tetracyanoborate	Ph_{4}P[B(CN)_{4}]						melt 466.2	
	[nBuPh_{3}P][B(CN)_{4}]						melt 73 °C dec 374 °C	
	[EtPh_{3}P][B(CN)_{4}]	orthorhombic	Pnna	a = 14.1777 b = 13.4214 c = 12.3199 Z = 4	2344.29	1.151	melt 98 °C dec 370 °C	
	[nBu_{4}P][B(CN)_{4}]	orthorhombic	Pnna	a = 18.2187 b = 12.0707 c = 11.6704 Z = 4	2566.5	0.968	melt 73 °C dec 372 °C	
	[Ph_{4}P][B(CN)_{4}]	tetragonal	I4̅2d	a = 12.948 c = 29.382 Z = 8	4925	1.225	melt 193 °C dec 390 °C	
2-hydroxyethyl-triphenylphosphonium tetracyanidoborate	C_{20}H_{20}OP[B(CN)_{4}]	monoclinic	P2_{1}/n	a = 14.1418 b = 10.5821 c = 15.4684 β = 94.622°	2307.32		colourless;	
triphenyl-N-(triphenylphosphoranylidene)phosphoraniminium tetrakis(cyano)borate		monoclinic	P2_{1}/n	a=10.732 b=24.966 c=13.375 β=101.77° Z=4	3508	1.237	melt 162 °C	
	H[B(CN)_{4}]							
hydroxonium tetracyanoborate	H_{3}O[B(CN)_{4}]							
	H_{5}O_{2}[B(CN)_{4}]							
sodium tetracyanoborate	Na[B(CN)_{4}]	cubic	Fd3̅m	a = 11.680 Z = 8	1593.4	1.150	colourless; giant negative thermal expansion 100K to 650K	
	Na[B(CN)_{4}]·THF,	orthorhombic	Pnma	a = 13.908 b = 9.288 c = 8.738 Z = 4	1128.8	1.236	colourless	
12-crown-4	[Na(C_{8}H_{16}O_{4})_{2}][B(CN)_{4}]	orthorhombic	Pnna	a=10.8630 b=20.619 c=11.3489				
15-crown-5	[Na(C_{10}H_{20}O_{5})][B(CN)_{4}]	monoclinic	P2_{1}/c	a=12.8859 b=14.2646 c=10.0379 β=91.975°				
	Mg[B(CN)_{4}]_{2}							
	[Mg(H_{2}O)_{2}][B(CN)_{4}]_{2}	tetragonal	I4̅3d	a=12.3940 c=9.2041 Z=4	1413.85	1.363		
	[Mg(H_{2}O)_{6}][B(CN)_{4}]_{2}	triclinic	P1̅	a=9.0078 b=9.7507 c=11.589 α=82.034° β=68.642° γ=72.303° Z=2	902.7	1.333		
	[Mg(DMF)_{6}][B(CN)_{4}]_{2}	triclinic	P1̅	a=8.6187 b=11.1119 c=12.2149 α=66.0996° β=75.570° γ=76.422° Z=1	1023.9	1.123		
potassium tetracyanoborate	K[B(CN)_{4}]	cubic	I4_{1}/a	a = 6.976 c = 14.210 Z = 4	691.5			
	[Ca(H_{2}O)_{3}][B(CN)_{4}]_{2}	triclinic	P1̅	a=9.5347 b=10.2205 c=10.4874 α=68.283° β=89.223° γ=63.152 Z=2	832.45	1.292		
	[Ca(H_{2}O)_{2}(CH_{3}CN)][B(CN)_{4}]_{2}	monoclinic	P2_{1}/c	a=12.2203 b=12.6637 c=13.5191 β=116.538	1871.71	1.231		
	Na[B(CN)_{4}{Cr(CO)_{5}}]							
	Na[B(CN)_{4}{Cr(CO)_{5}}_{2}]							
	Na[B(CN)_{4}{Cr(CO)_{5}}_{3}]							
	Na[B(CN)_{4}{Cr(CO)_{5}}_{4}]							
	Na_{2}[{Cr(CO)_{4}(B(CN)_{4})}_{2}]							
	Na_{4}[{Cr(CO)_{3}(B(CN)_{4})}_{4}]						cube shaped complex	
	[Fe^{II}{κ^{2}ΝB(CN)_{4}]}_{2}]							
	[Fe^{II}(H_{2}O)_{2}{κ^{2}ΝB(CN)_{4}]}_{2}]	tetragonal	I4̅2d	a = 12.3662 c = 9.2066 Z = 4				
	[Fe^{III}(H_{2}O)_{6}][B(CN)_{4}]_{3}	rhombohedral	R3̅c	a = 14.9017 c = 20.486 Z = 6				
	[Fe(DMF)_{6}][B(CN)_{4}]	triclinic	P1̅	a = 8.6255(3) Å, b = 11.0544(4) Å, c = 12.2377 α=65.987° β=75.521° γ=76.639° Z = 1				
	Co[B(CN)_{4}]_{2}·2H_{2}O	tetragonal	I4̅2d	a=12.2922 c=9.2235 Z=4				
	Ni[B(CN)_{4}]_{2}·0.5H_{2}O							
bis((ethane-1,2-diyl)-bis(diphenylphosphine))-nickel(ii) bis[tetrakis(cyanido)borate]	[Ni(dppe)_{2}][B(CN)_{4}]_{2}	monoclinic	P2_{1}/c	a =18.4584 b=13.3628 c =22.9747 β =105.253°			yellow	
hexakis(pyridine N-oxide)-nickel(ii) bis[tetrakis(cyanido)borate]	[Ni(pyNO)_{6}][B(CN)_{4}]_{2}		R3̅	a=12.9613 c =22.6070			yellow	
tetrakis(dimethyl sulfoxide)-bis(tetrakis(cyanido)borate)-nickel	Ni(DMSO)_{4}{NC-B(CN)_{3}}_{2}	triclinic	P1̅	a=8.9732 b=10.0327 c=16.9838 α=82.303° β=81.013° γ=72.357°			colourless	
bis((ethane-1,2-diyl)bis[oxo(diphenyl)-phosphine])-bis(tetrakis(cyanido)borate)-nickel(ii) dichloromethane solvate	Ni(dppeO_{2})_{2}{NC-B(CN)_{3}}_{2}	triclinic	P1̅	a=10.9158 b=12.8898 c=13.2656 α=64.935° β=89.842° γ =72.389°				
cuprous tetracyanoborate	Cu[B(CN)_{4}]	cubic	Fd3̅m	a = 5.4314 Z = 1	160.23	1.849	colourless	
	Cu[B(CN)_{4}]_{2}	monoclinic	C2/m	a = 13.185 b = 7.2919 c = 6.029 β = 93.02° Z = 2				
zinc tetracyanoborate	Zn⁢[B⁢(CN)_{4}]_{2}	trigonal	P3̅m1	a = 7.5092 c = 6.0159 Z = 1				
	[Zn(DMF)_{6}][B(CN)_{4}]	triclinic	P1̅					
rubidium tetracyanoborate	Rb[B(CN)_{4}]	tetragonal	I4_{1}/a	a = 7.1354 c = 14.8197 Z = 4	754.53	1.764	colourless	
	Y(H_{2}O)_{7}{κ^{1}N-B(CN)_{4}}][B(CN)_{4}]_{2}							
	Y(H_{2}O)_{8}][B(CN)_{4}]_{3}·3H_{2}O							
	[Y(H_{2}O)_{8}{B(CN)_{4}}_{3}]·H_{2}O	monoclinic	C2/c	a=16.0468 b=20.5478 c=21.1799 β=112.259°				
	[Y(EtOH)(H_{2}O)_{4}{B(CN)_{4}}_{3}]·EtOH	orthorhobic	P2_{1}2_{1}2_{1}	a=13.204 b=13.793 c=17.041				
	[Ru(Cp)(C_{6}H_{6})]B(CN)_{4}							
	[Ru_{4}(Cp)_{4}{B(CN)_{4}}_{4}]							
	Ag[B(CN)_{4}]	cubic	P 43m	a = 5.732 Z = 1	188.3		negative thermal expansion 100-600K	
caesium tetracyanoborate	Cs[B(CN)_{4}]	tetragonal	I4_{1}/a	a = 7.300 c = 15.340 Z=4	817.5	2.013	colourless	
	La{B(CN)_{4}}_{3}(H_{2}O)_{5}]·0.5H_{2}O	monoclinic	P2_{1}/n					
	^{1}_{∞}[La(NO_{3})_{2}[B(CN)_{4}](H_{2}O)_{4}]	monoclinic	P2_{1}/c	a=11.902 b=11.629 c=10.850 β=111.77° Z=4	1394.7	2.143	colourless	
EMIM 1-ethyl-3-methylimidazolium	[EMIM] ^{1}_{∞}[LaNO_{3}{B(CN)_{4}}_{3}(H_{2}O)_{3}]	monoclinic	P12_{1}/n1	a=9.561 b=20.688 c=16.487 β=104.85° Z=4	3152	1.498	colourless	
	La(EtOH)_{3}(H_{2}O)_{2}{B(CN)_{4}}_{3}	monoclinic	P2_{1}/n	a=10.443 b=17.973 c=17.484 β=97.843°				
	La(EtOH)(H_{2}O)_{4}{B(CN)_{4}} ·Et_{2}O	orthorhombic	Pbca	a=18.513 b=19.067 c=21.460				
	Ce{B(CN)_{4}}_{3}(H_{2}O)_{5}]·0.5H_{2}O	monoclinic	P2_{1}/n	a=15.3808 b=10.8020 c=33.2887 β=103.250° Z=4	5383.5	1.443		
	Pr{B(CN)_{4}}_{3}(H_{2}O)_{5}]·0.5H_{2}O	monoclinic	P2_{1}/n	a=15.393 b=10.777 c=33.205 β=102.961° Z=4	5368			
	[Pr(H_{2}O)_{9}][B(CN)_{4}]_{3}·(CH_{3})_{2}CO	monoclinic	C2/c	a=16.119 b=20.638 c=21.572 β=111.961°				
	Nd{B(CN)_{4}}_{3}(H_{2}O)_{5}]·0.5H_{2}O	monoclinic	P2_{1}/n	a=15.357 b=10.740 c=33.224 β=102.769° Z=4	5344			
	Sm{B(CN)_{4}}_{3}(H_{2}O)_{5}]·0.5H_{2}O	monoclinic	P2_{1}/n	a=15.328 b=10.714 c=33.055 β=102.68° Z=4	5300			
	Gd{B(CN)_{4}}_{3}(H_{2}O)_{5}]·0.5H_{2}O	monoclinic	P2_{1}/n	a=15.304 b=10.673 c=32.999 β=102.609° Z=4	5260			
	Eu[B(CN)_{4}]_{2}•THF	cubic	Fm3̅m	a=12.2898 Z=4	1856.25	1.624		
	Eu{B(CN)_{4}}_{3}(H_{2}O)_{5}]·0.5H_{2}O	monoclinic	P2_{1}/n	a=15.336 b=10.709=33.076 β=102.652° Z=4	5300			
	Tb(H_{2}O)_{7}{κ^{1}N-B(CN)_{4}}][B(CN)_{4}]_{2}							
	Tb(H_{2}O)_{8}][B(CN)_{4}]_{3}·3H_{2}O	monoclinic	C2/c	a=15.9786 b=20.5317 c=21.1413 β=112.226°				
	Dy(H_{2}O)_{7}{κ^{1}N-B(CN)_{4}}][B(CN)_{4}]_{2}							
	Dy(H_{2}O)_{8}][B(CN)_{4}]_{3}·3H_{2}O	monoclinic	C2/c	a=16.0293 b=20.5472 c=21.1881 β=112.234°				
	Ho(H_{2}O)_{7}{κ^{1}N-B(CN)_{4}}][B(CN)_{4}]_{2}							
	Ho(H_{2}O)_{8}][B(CN)_{4}]_{3}·3H_{2}O	monoclinic	C2/c					
	Er(H_{2}O)_{7}{κ^{1}N-B(CN)_{4}}][B(CN)_{4}]_{2}	monoclinic	P2_{1}/n	a=13.7705 b=21.2528 c=19.1657 β=96.501°				
	[Er(H_{2}O)_{8}][B(CN)_{4}]_{3}·(CH_{3})_{2}CO	monoclinic	C2/c	a=16.2090 b=20.5676 c=21.2564 β=112.379°				
	Tm(H_{2}O)_{7}{κ^{1}N-B(CN)_{4}}][B(CN)_{4}]_{2}							
	Tm(H_{2}O)_{8}][B(CN)_{4}]_{3}·3H_{2}O	monoclinic	C2/c					
	Yb(H_{2}O)_{7}{κ^{1}N-B(CN)_{4}}][B(CN)_{4}]_{2}							
	Yb(H_{2}O)_{8}][B(CN)_{4}]_{3}·3H_{2}O							
	Yb[B(CN)_{4}]_{2}•THF	cubic	Fm3̅m	a=12.1147 Z=4	1778			
	Lu(H_{2}O)_{7}{κ^{1}N-B(CN)_{4}}][B(CN)_{4}]_{2}							
	Lu(H_{2}O)_{8}][B(CN)_{4}]_{3}·3H_{2}O	monoclinic	C2/c					
	[Lu(EtOH)(H_{2}O)_{7}][B(CN)_{4}]_{3}·EtOH·0.5H_{2}O							
thallium tetracyanoborate	Tl[B(CN)_{4}]	tetragonal	I4_{1}/a	a = 7.0655 c = 14.6791 Z = 4	732.57	2.895	colourless	
Mercury(II)-bis(tetracyanoborate)	Hg⁢[B⁢(CN)_{4}]_{2}	trigonal	P3̅m1	a = 7.8175 c = 6.0168 Z=1	318.44	2.244		
Dimercury(I)-bis(tetracyanoborate)	Hg_{2}[B(CN)_{4}]_{2}	orthorhombic	Pbcm	a = 5.689 b = 32.809 c = 6.0168 Z = 4	1389.6	3.016		
(μ-aqua)-bis(μ-tetracyanoborate)-aqua-lead	Pb_{2}(H_{2}O)_{4}{B(CN)_{4}}_{4}	triclinic	P1̅	a=9.4912 b=9.901 c=10.1044 α=107.457° β=115.926° γ=101.328°	753.0	2.086	soluble in methanol and acetonitrile	
(μ-acetato)-(μ-tetracyanoborate)-ethanol-lead	Pb_{2}(O_{2}CCH_{3})_{2}{B(CN)_{4}}_{2}(C_{2}H_{5}OH)_{2}	monoclinic	P2_{1}/n	a=7.9955 b=17.4564 c=9.9725 β=97.429°	1380.2	2.056		
