= Wildlife Services =

Program for wildlife damage management

Agency overview
- Formed: 1895
- Preceding agency: Animal Damage Control (in APHIS and FWS)
- Jurisdiction: Federal government of the United States
- Headquarters: Washington, D.C.
- Employees: 2,004 (FY10)
- Annual budget: US$121 million (FY10): 47.8% federal, 52.2% cooperator-provided
- Agency executives: Gregory Parham, Administrator of APHIS; Janet L. Bucknall, Deputy Administrator for Wildlife Services
- Parent agency: Animal and Plant Health Inspection Service
- Website: https://www.aphis.usda.gov/wildlife-services

Wildlife Services is the program intended to provide Federal resources to resolve wildlife interactions that threaten public health and safety, as well as agricultural, property, and natural resources. The program is part of the United States Department of Agriculture. Wildlife Services works in every state to conduct integrated wildlife damage management, a specialized field within the wildlife management profession.

== History and mission ==
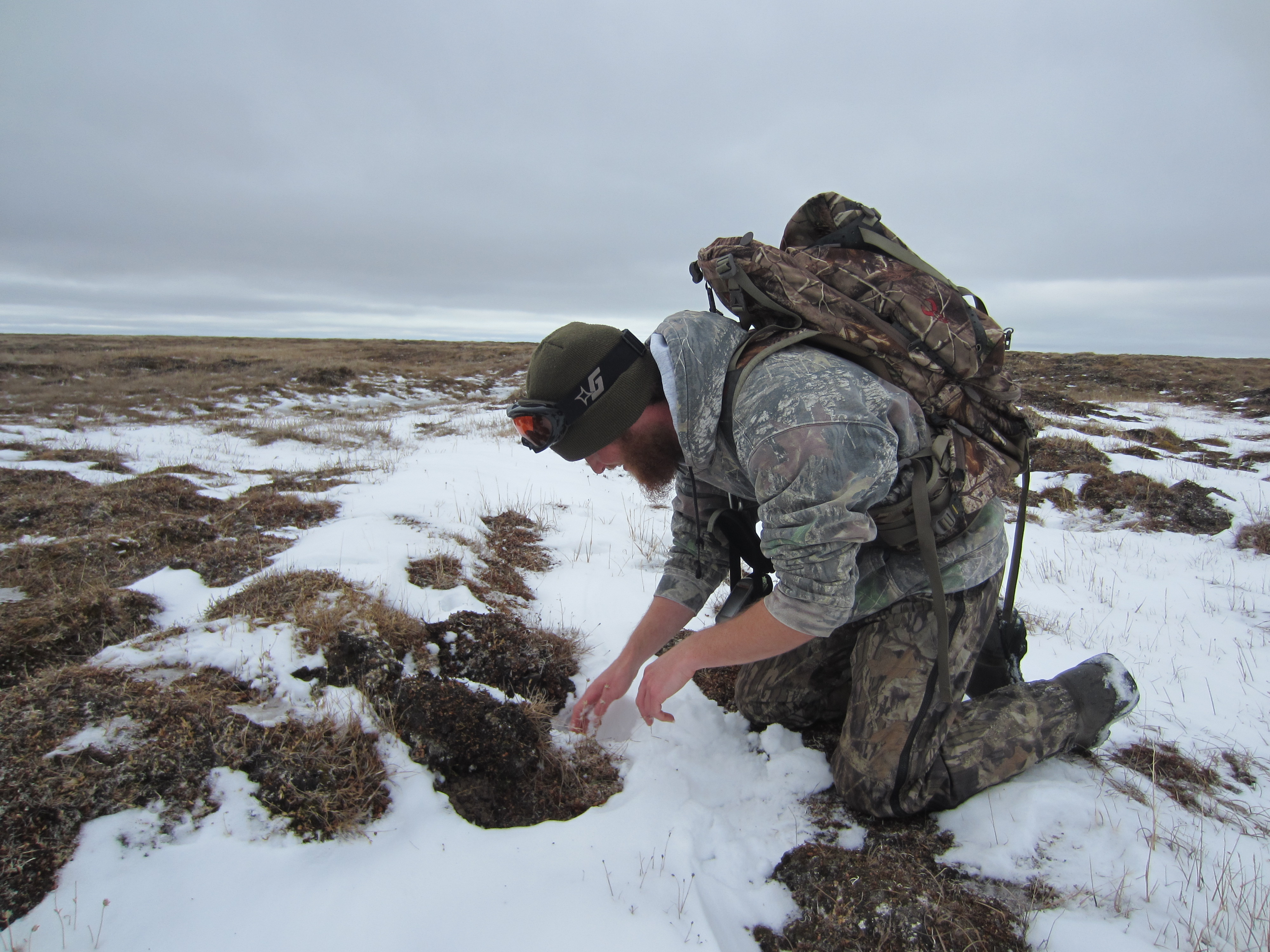
Wildlife Services trapper setting a fox trap at an Steller's eider conservation area in Alaska

Wildlife Services’ goals and objectives have evolved significantly since its establishment in 1895 as part of the Department of Agriculture. At first the program focused on rodent management and predator control activities. Although its mission and legal authority have not changed, the range of activities has increased over time due to changing social and economic needs.

The mission of Wildlife Services is to provide federal leadership among stakeholders in the wildlife management profession, the public, nongovernmental organizations, and governmental/research entities to address wildlife-related problems. The program is committed to the principle that wildlife is a publicly owned resource held in our trust in there actions and managed by state and federal agencies. Its primary statutory authorities are found in two acts of Congress: The Act of March 2, 1931 (46 Stat. 1468; 7 U.S.C. 426-426b) as amended, and The Act of December 22, 1987 (101 Stat. 1329-331, 7 U.S.C. 426c).

Wildlife Services was originally established as the Division of Predatory Animal and Rodent Control within the Bureau of Biological Survey. In 1939, the Bureau of Biological Survey and the Bureau of Fisheries in the Department of Commerce were transferred to the Department of the Interior to form the Fish and Wildlife Service. In 1985 Wildlife Services returned to USDA as Animal Damage Control (ADC), as part of APHIS, the agency whose mission is to protect the health and value of U.S. agriculture and natural resources. Since 1997 the agency has been known as USDA Wildlife Services.

Wildlife damage management can engender controversy, often around the use of lethal controls. Most wildlife encountered in damage situations (5.1%) are dispersed rather than killed. Removal of native foxes/coyotes and non-native species, such as European starlings, feral swine and nutria, account for most of the animals removed. A 20-member National Wildlife Services Advisory Committee, appointed by the Secretary of Agriculture, advises the program and serves as a public forum.

== Criticism ==
Wildlife Services has been the subject of widespread criticism on the part of conservation and wildlife protection organizations such as Defenders of Wildlife, Center for Biological Diversity, Predator Defense, the Natural Resources Defense Council, and others. These groups argue that Wildlife Services is not justified in killing millions of predators and other animals each year given the lack of evidence that these animals pose a threat to the public. Furthermore, the groups claim that this killing is conducted on behalf of the livestock industry rather than public safety and has resulted in the imperilment and near-extinction of dozens of species.

A 2014 article in The Washington Post detailed Wildlife Services' extermination of 4 million animals in 2013, many of which were killed en masse. Amy Atwood, of the Center for Biological Diversity, was quoted in the article describing Wildlife Services' work as “a staggering killing campaign, bankrolled by taxpayers.” In fiscal year 2014, 2.7 million animals were reported as killed by Wildlife Services.

Wildlife Services has also received criticism for its use of the M44 cyanide device for killing coyotes/fox and other Canids, as several incidents have occurred with family pets being killed. A 2020 article in The Guardian described how Wildlife Services deploys cyanide "bombs" to kill wildlife. In 2017, fourteen year-old Canyon Mansfield was seriously injured and his dog killed by one such bomb. In 2019, facing concerns about the dangers of spreading poison in the environment, Oregon banned the use of cyanide bombs. In California, similar worries led to a partial termination of cooperative agreements with the agency.

== Programs ==
The Wildlife Services Operational Program provides wildlife damage management assistance to the public, and is administered through two Regional Offices (Fort Collins, Colorado, and Raleigh, North Carolina) as well as state and district offices in the 50 states, District of Columbia, the U.S. Virgin Islands, and Guam. Program wildlife biologists provide technical advice and direct management assistance to individuals with problems related to wildlife. The public may access Wildlife Services assistance by calling 1-800/4USDA-WS (1-866-487-3297).

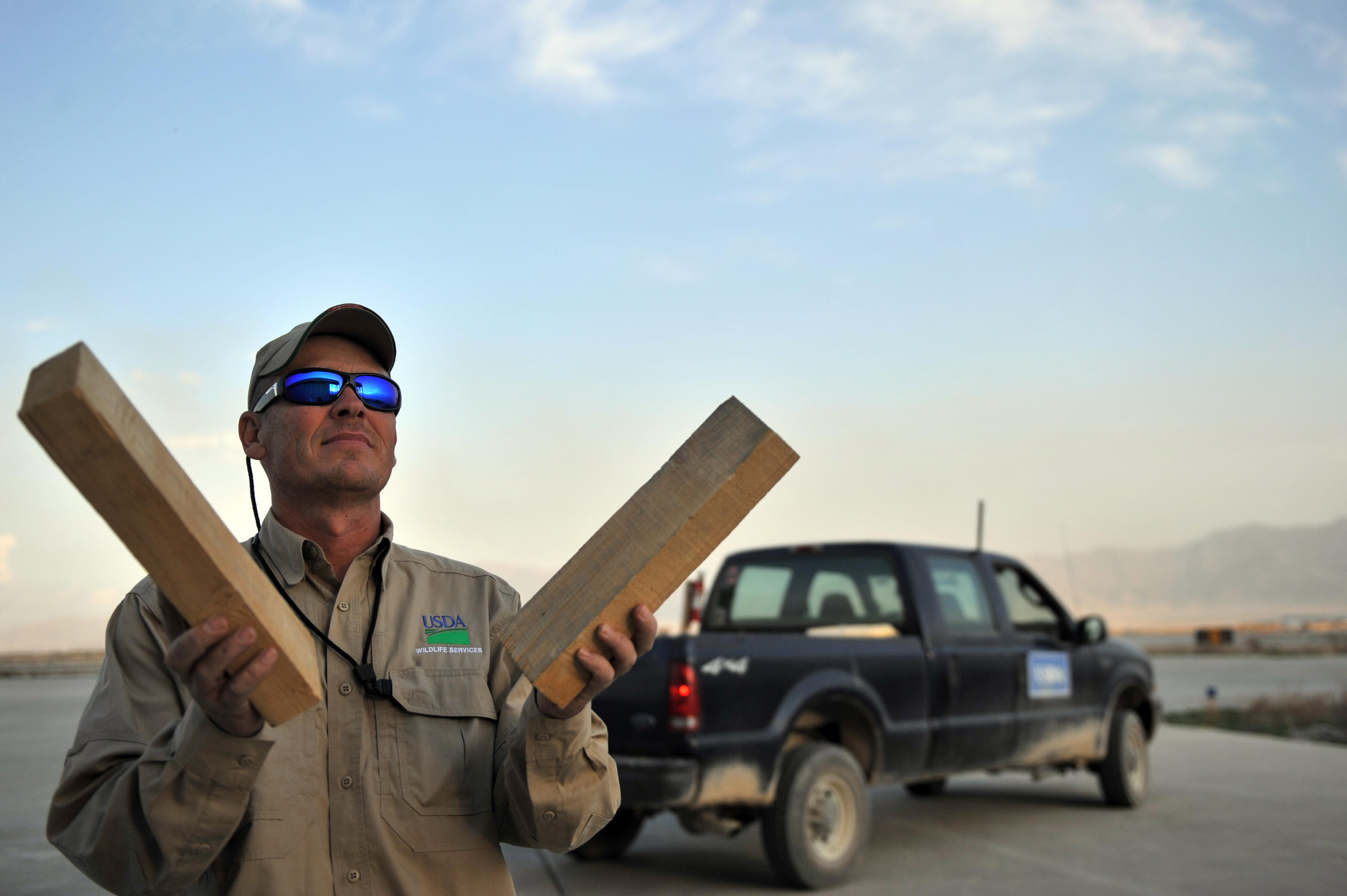
Airport Wildlife Hazards Program control agent at Bagram Airfield, Afghanistan

The Airport Wildlife Hazards Program provides leadership in addressing the conditions that contribute to aircraft-wildlife strikes throughout the country. It works with the civil and military aviation community, specifically airports, the Federal Aviation Administration (FAA) and the National Transportation Safety Board (NTSB) to minimize wildlife strikes to aircraft and protect public safety.

The National Environmental Program ensures that program activities comply with the National Environmental Policy Act (NEPA), which requires federal agencies to evaluate environmental impacts within their decision-making processes. It ensures that environmental information is available to public officials and citizens before making decisions and taking actions. To fulfill this responsibility, Wildlife Services prepares analyses of the environmental effects of program activities.

The National Rabies Management Program, a multi-agency cooperative program led by Wildlife Services, implements a coordinated program to contain and eventually manage rabies in wildlife. With partners, the program conducts rabies control efforts in 25 states, including distributing oral rabies vaccination (ORV) or conducting enhanced wildlife rabies surveillance. The focus is on specific rabies virus strains in raccoons, coyotes, gray foxes, and feral dogs. It works closely with the Centers for Disease Control and Canadian and Mexican partners through the North American Rabies Management Plan.

The National Wildlife Disease Program safeguards agricultural trade by conducting surveillance activities in all 50 states in partnership with other organizations and promotes development of wildlife disease monitoring programs worldwide. Its Surveillance and Emergency Response System is the country’s only comprehensive, nationally coordinated system with the capability of addressing diseases in wildlife. Its wildlife disease biologists can mobilize and arrive on-site within 48 hours of a request. The program represents APHIS’ first line of defense against wildlife diseases that can move to humans and livestock.

The National Wildlife Research Center (NWRC) is devoted to resolving problems caused by the interaction of wild animals and society. NWRC applies scientific expertise to develop practical methods to resolve these problems and to maintain the quality of environments shared with wildlife. It evaluates damage situations and develops methods and tools to reduce or eliminate damage and resolve land-use conflicts. NWRC scientists study birds, mammalian predators, rodents, and other wildlife that cause serious, but localized, damage problems. It conducts studies to ensure that the methods developed are biologically sound, effective, safe, economical, and socially responsible. NWRC scientists produce the appropriate methods, technology, and materials for reducing animal damage. Through the publication of results and the exchange of technical information, NWRC provides valuable data and expertise to the public and the scientific community, as well as to APHIS's Wildlife Services program.

== See also ==
- Endangered Species Act
- Migratory Bird Treaty Act
- US Fish and Wildlife Service
- Federal Aviation Administration (FAA)
- National Transportation Safety Board (NTSB)
- Centers for Disease Control and Prevention
- The Wildlife Society
