= Phosphorus tricyanide =

Names
- Other names: Phosphorus(III) cyanide; Tricyanophosphine

Identifiers
CAS Number	1116-01-4
3D model (JSmol)	Interactive image
ChemSpider	120617
PubChem CID	136869
CompTox Dashboard (EPA)	DTXSID30149693
- InChI: InChI=1S/C3N3P/c4-1-7(2-5)3-6 Key: VXFKMOLPHLQGLH-UHFFFAOYSA-N
- SMILES: N#CP(C#N)C#N

Properties
Chemical formula	P(CN)_{3}
Molar mass	109.028 g·mol^{−1}
Appearance	white crystals
Boiling point	190 °C (374 °F; 463 K) sublimes
- Except where otherwise noted, data are given for materials in their standard state (at 25 °C [77 °F], 100 kPa). Infobox references

Phosphorus tricyanide is an inorganic compound with the chemical formula P(CN)_{3}. It can be produced by the reaction of phosphorus trichloride and trimethyl(iso)cyanosilane. The reaction of phosphorus tribromide and silver cyanide in diethyl ether produce phosphorus tricyanide too.

PBr_{3} + 3 AgCN → P(CN)_{3} + 3 AgBr

Its thermal decomposition can produce graphite phase C_{3}N_{3}P.

Phosphorus tricyanide reacts with [Re(CO)_{5}]^{+}[BF_{4}]^{−} to form {P[CN-Re(CO)_{5}]_{3}}[BF_{4}]_{3}.
