= Potassium hexacyanochromate(III) =

- (K^{+})_{3}[Cr(CN)_{6}]^{3−}
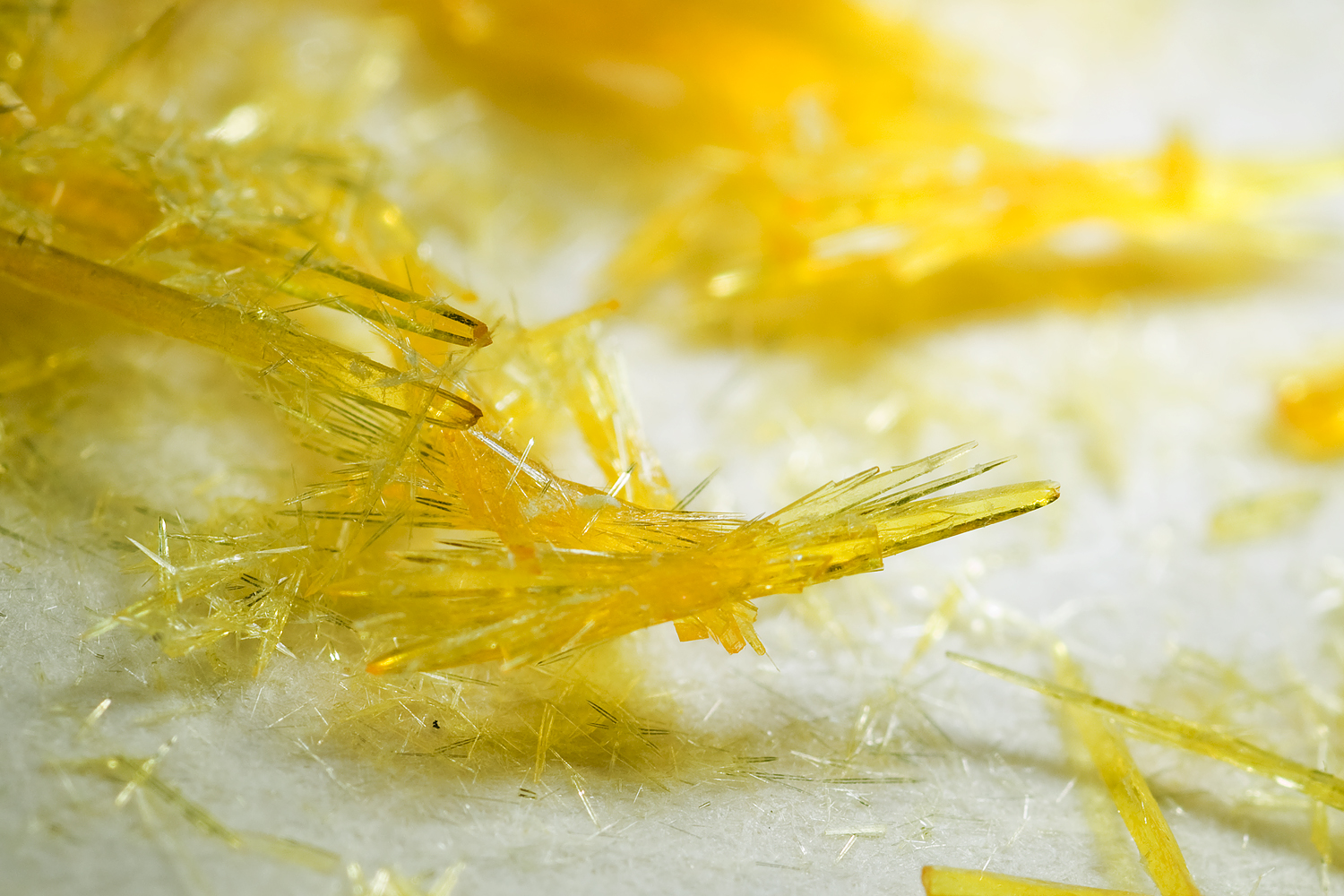

Names
- IUPAC name Potassium hexacyanochromate(III)

Identifiers
CAS Number	13601-11-1
3D model (JSmol)	Interactive image
ChemSpider	19988791
ECHA InfoCard	100.033.694
EC Number	237-079-8
MeSH	Hexacyanochromate
PubChem CID	21123765
CompTox Dashboard (EPA)	DTXSID10929218
- InChI: InChI=1S/6CN.Cr.3K/c6*1-2;;;;/q;;;;;;-3;3*+1 Key: VOCDJOPDZZSPRQ-UHFFFAOYSA-N
- SMILES: [K+].[K+].[K+].N#C[Cr-3](C#N)(C#N)(C#N)(C#N)C#N

Properties
Chemical formula	C_{6}CrK_{3}N_{6}
Molar mass	325.399 g·mol^{−1}
Appearance	Vivid, yellow, opaque crystals
Density	1.71 g/cm^{3}
Solubility in water	30.96 g/100 mL (20 °C)
- Except where otherwise noted, data are given for materials in their standard state (at 25 °C [77 °F], 100 kPa). Infobox references

Potassium hexacyanochromate(III) is an inorganic compound with the formula K_{3}[Cr(CN)_{6}]. It consists of three potassium cations and [Cr(CN)_{6}]^{3−} anion. It is a yellow, air-stable, paramagnetic solid. It is isomorphous with potassium ferricyanide.

== Synthesis ==
The salt was reported in 1800s, but early preparations started with Cr(III) salts, which are poor precursors. It is readily prepared by cyanation of chromium(II) compounds, such as chromous acetate, followed by an oxidation step:

[Cr_{2}(OAc)_{4}] + 12 KCN → 2 K_{4}[Cr(CN)_{6}] + 4 KOAc (OAc^{-} = acetate)
4 K_{4}[Cr(CN)_{6}] + O_{2} + 2 H_{2}O → 4 K_{3}[Cr(CN)_{6}] + 4 KOH

The procedure exploits the lability of Cr(II) salts and their easy oxidation to give the exchange-inert Cr(III) derivative.

== Reactions ==
Reduction of hexacyanochromate(III) gives the Cr(II) and Cr(0) derivatives, [Cr(CN)_{6}]^{4-} and [Cr(CN)_{6}]^{6-}, respectively.

The hexacyanochromate(III) anion serves as a ligand towards other metal electrophiles.
