= Lithium cyanide =

Toxic crystalline salt

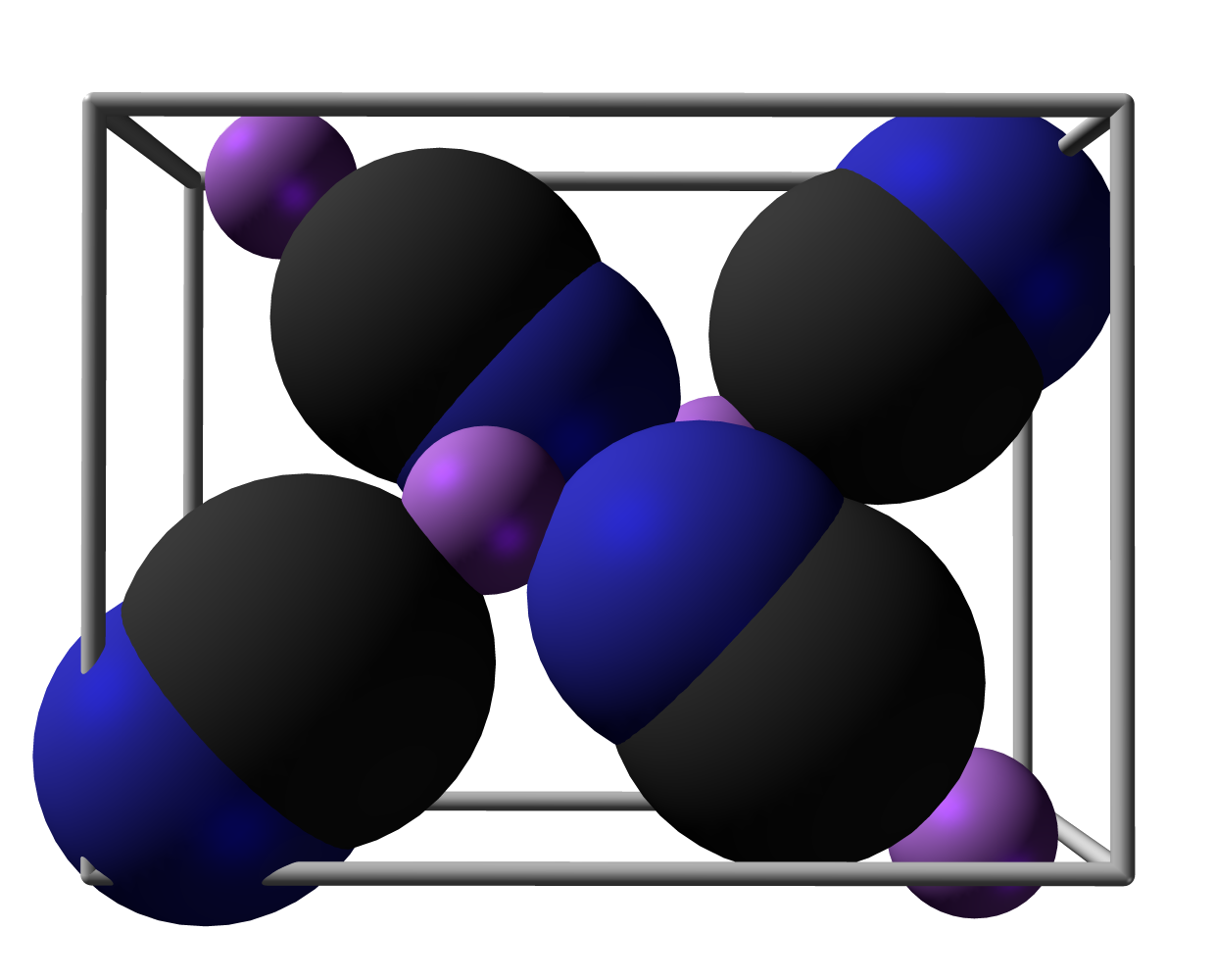

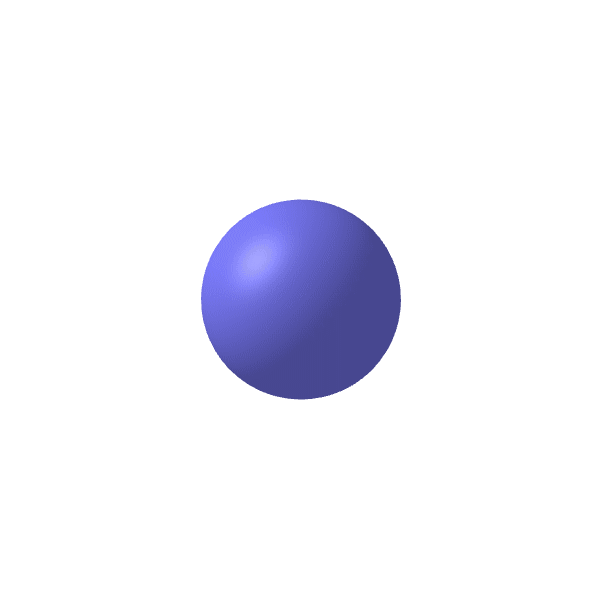

Identifiers
CAS Number	2408-36-8
3D model (JSmol)	Interactive image
ChemSpider	68007
ECHA InfoCard	100.017.554
EC Number	219-308-3
PubChem CID	75478
UN number	1935
CompTox Dashboard (EPA)	DTXSID10946920
- InChI: InChI=1S/CN.Li/c1-2;/q-1;+1 Key: JORQDGTZGKHEEO-UHFFFAOYSA-N
- SMILES: [Li+].[C-]#N

Properties
Chemical formula	LiCN
Molar mass	32.959 g/mol
Appearance	White Powder
Density	1.073 g/cm^{3} (18 °C)
Melting point	160 °C (320 °F; 433 K)
Boiling point	decomposes
Solubility in water	Soluble
Henry's law constant (k_{H})	N/A

Structure
Crystal structure	-
Coordination geometry	Fourfold

Hazards
- GHS labelling
Pictograms	(GHS02: Flammable) (GHS06: Toxic) (GHS09: Environmental hazard)
Signal word	Danger
Hazard statements	H226, H300, H310, H330, H410
Precautionary statements	P210, P233, P240, P241, P242, P243, P260, P262, P264, P270, P271, P273, P280, P284, P301+P310, P302+P350, P303+P361+P353, P304+P340, P310, P320, P321, P330, P361, P363, P370+P378, P391, P403+P233, P403+P235, P405, P501
NFPA 704 (fire diamond)	4 0 1
Flash point	57 °C (135 °F; 330 K)
Autoignition temperature	N/A
Safety data sheet (SDS)	742899

Related compounds
Related compounds	Sodium cyanide, Potassium cyanide, Hydrogen cyanide
- Except where otherwise noted, data are given for materials in their standard state (at 25 °C [77 °F], 100 kPa). Infobox references

Lithium cyanide is an inorganic compound with the chemical formula LiCN. It is a toxic, white coloured, hygroscopic, water-soluble salt that finds only niche uses.

== Preparation ==
LiCN is produced from the reaction of lithium hydroxide and hydrogen cyanide. A laboratory-scale preparation uses acetone cyanohydrin as a surrogate for HCN:

(CH_{3})_{2}C(OH)CN + LiOH → (CH_{3})_{2}CO + LiCN + H_{2}

== Uses ==
The compound decomposes to lithium cyanamide (Li_{2}CN_{2}) and carbon when heated to a temperature close to but below 600 °C. Acids react to give hydrogen cyanide.

Lithium cyanide can be used as a reagent for organic compound cyanation.

RX + LiCN → RCN + LiX
