= Pentacyanocobaltate =

Identifiers
| CAS Number | 14971-18-7 |
| 3D model (JSmol) | Interactive image |
| PubChem CID | 22141881 |
- InChI: InChI=1S/5CN.Co/c5*1-2;/q5*-1;+2 Key: YOZCCRZCYZQCAC-UHFFFAOYSA-N
- SMILES: [N-]#C[Co+2](C#[N-])(C#[N-])(C#[N-])C#[N-]

Properties
| Chemical formula | C_{5}CoN_{5}^{3−} |
| Molar mass | 189.025 g·mol^{−1} |
- Except where otherwise noted, data are given for materials in their standard state (at 25 °C [77 °F], 100 kPa). Infobox references

In chemistry, pentacyanocobaltate is the coordination complex with the formula [Co(CN)_{5}]^{3−}. When crystallized with a quaternary ammonium cation, it can be obtained as a yellow solid. Pentacyanocobaltate attracted attention as an early example of a metal complex that reacts with hydrogen. It contains low-spin cobalt(II), with a doublet ground state.

== Synthesis and structure ==
Aqueous solutions of pentacyanocobaltate are produced by the addition of five or more equivalents of a cyanide salt to a solution of a cobalt(II) salt. Initially this reaction produces insoluble cobalt dicyanide, but this solid dissolves in the presence of the excess cyanide. Pentacyanocobaltate forms within seconds. When prepared using a quaternary ammonium (quat) cyanide, crystals can be obtained with the formula (quat)_{3}[Co(CN)_{5}]. According to X-ray crystallography, the salt features square pyamidal [Co(CN)_{5}]^{3−}.

== Reactions ==
Solutions of [Co(CN)_{5}]^{3−} undergo a variety of reactions. The complex attracted attention in the 1940s for its reactivity toward hydrogen, which is now understood to produce a cobalt hydride:

2[Co(CN)_{5}]^{3−} + H_{2} → 2 [Co(CN)_{5}H]^{2−}

When allowed to stand as a dilute solution for several minutes, the complex reacts with water to give two Co(III) derivatives:

2[Co(CN)_{5}]^{3−} + H_{2}O → [Co(CN)_{5}H]^{3−} + [Co(CN)_{5}OH]^{3−}

In concentrated solution, the complex dimerizes:

2[Co(CN)_{5}]^{3−} → [(NC)_{5}Co−Co(CN)_{5}]^{6−}

These complexes catalyze the selective reduction of conjugated dienes, probably through an allyl intermediate.

With benzyl chloride and related alkylating agents, Co(III) alkyls are formed:

2[Co(CN)_{5}]^{3−} + C_{6}H_{5}CH_{2}Cl → [Co(CN)_{5}CH_{2}C_{6}H_{5}]^{3−} + [Co(CN)_{5}Cl]^{3−}
