= Potassium cyanide =

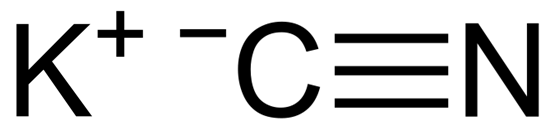

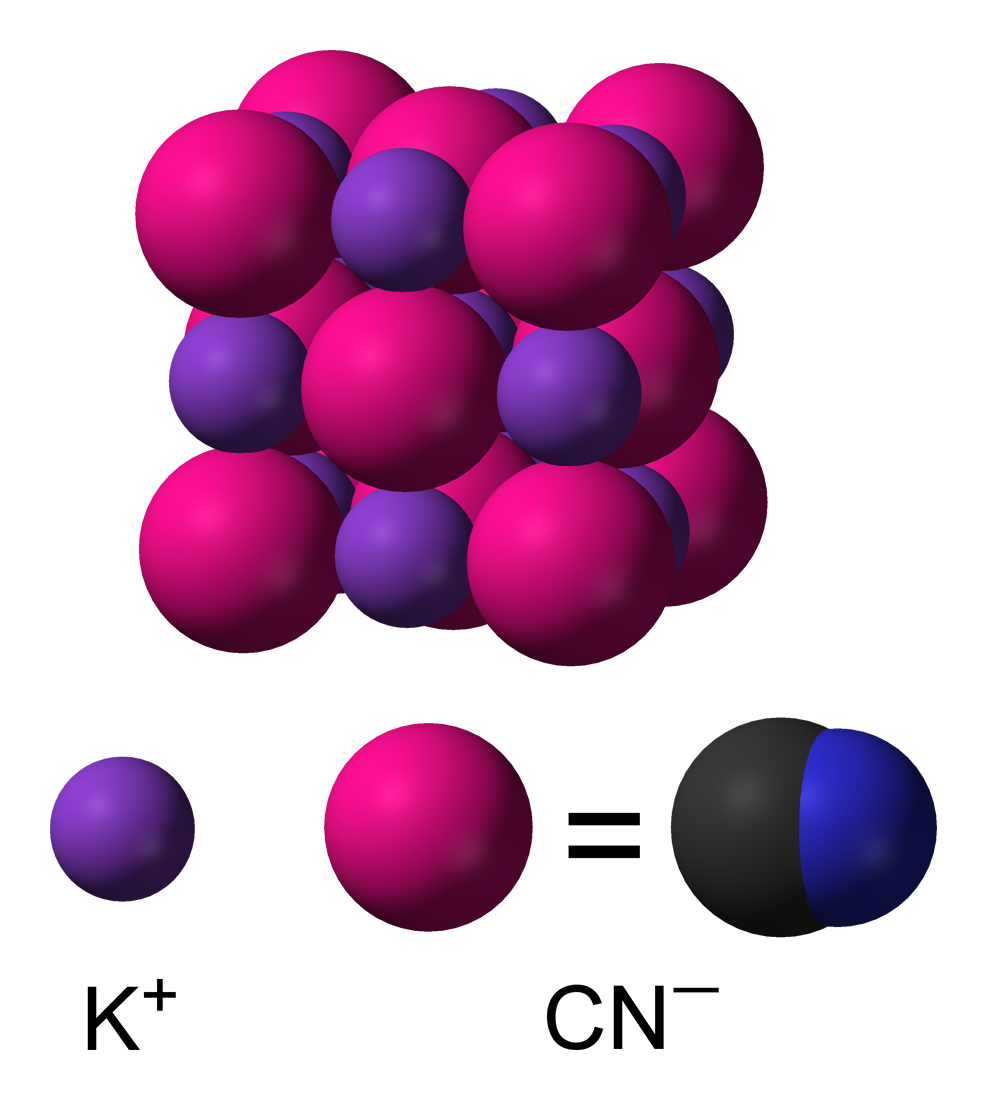

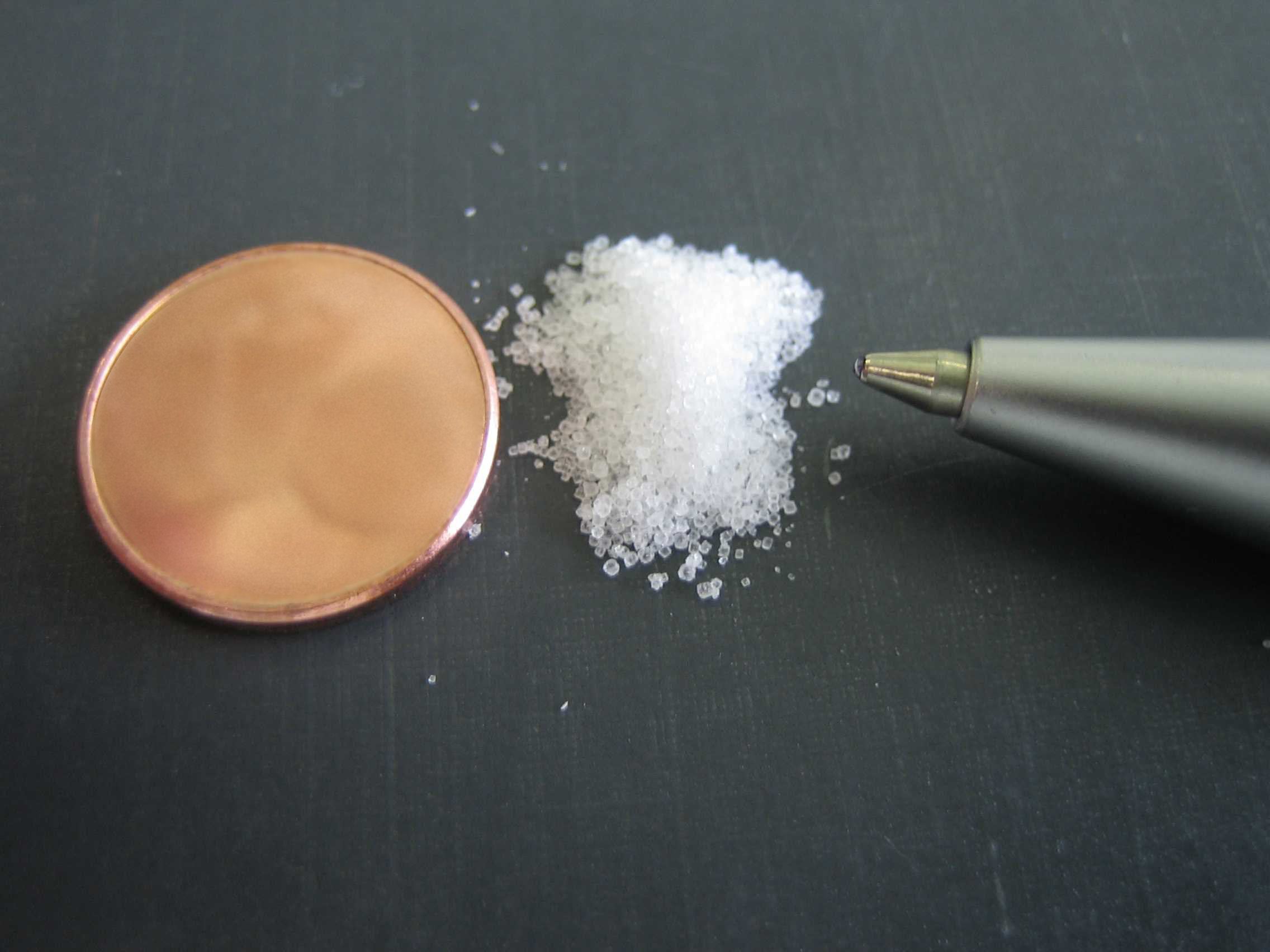

Names
- IUPAC name Potassium cyanide

Identifiers
CAS Number	151-50-8
3D model (JSmol)	Interactive image
ChEBI	CHEBI:33191
ChemSpider	8681
ECHA InfoCard	100.005.267
EC Number	205-792-3
PubChem CID	9032
RTECS number	TS8750000
UNII	MQD255M2ZO
UN number	1680
CompTox Dashboard (EPA)	DTXSID0024268
- InChI: InChI=1S/CN.K/c1-2;/q-1;+1 Key: NNFCIKHAZHQZJG-UHFFFAOYSA-N; InChI=1/CN.K/c1-2;/q-1;+1 Key: NNFCIKHAZHQZJG-UHFFFAOYAH
- SMILES: [K+].[C-]#N

Properties
Chemical formula	KCN
Molar mass	65.116 g·mol^{−1}
Appearance	White crystalline solid deliquescent
Odor	faint, bitter almond-like
Density	1.52 g/cm^{3}
Melting point	634.5 °C (1,174.1 °F; 907.6 K)
Boiling point	1,625 °C (2,957 °F; 1,898 K) at 101.3 kPa
Solubility in water	71.6 g/100 ml (25 °C (77 °F; 298 K)); 100 g/100 ml (100 °C (212 °F; 373 K))
Solubility in methanol	4.91 g/100 ml (20 °C (68 °F; 293 K))
Solubility in glycerol	soluble
Solubility in formamide	14.6 g/100 ml
Solubility in ethanol	0.57 g/100 ml
Acidity (pK_{a})	11.0
Magnetic susceptibility (χ)	37.0×10^{−6} cm^{3}/mol
Refractive index (n_{D})	1.410

Thermochemistry
Std molar entropy (S^{⦵}_{298})	127.8 J⋅K^{−1}·mol^{-1}
Std enthalpy of formation (Δ_{f}H^{⦵}_{298})	−131.5 kJ⋅mol^{−1}

Hazards
- GHS labelling
Pictograms	(GHS05: Corrosive) (GHS06: Toxic) (GHS08: Health hazard) (GHS09: Environmental hazard)
Signal word	Danger
Hazard statements	H290, H300+H310+H330, H372, H410
Precautionary statements	P234, P260, P262, P264, P270, P271, P273, P280, P284, P301+P310+P330, P302+P350, P304+P340+P310, P307+P311, P314, P362, P390, P391, P403+P233, P405, P501
NFPA 704 (fire diamond)	4 0 1
Flash point	Non-flammable
Threshold limit value (TLV)	5 mg/m^{3} (TWA), 5 mg/m^{3} (skin) (C)
- Lethal dose or concentration (LD, LC)
LD_{50} (median dose)	5 mg/kg (oral, rabbit); 10 mg/kg (oral, rat); 5 mg/kg (oral, rat); 8.5 mg/kg (oral, mouse)
- NIOSH (US health exposure limits)
PEL (Permissible)	5 mg/m^{3} (TWA, skin)
REL (Recommended)	5 mg/m^{3} (ceiling, 4.7 ppm, 10-minute)
IDLH (Immediate danger)	25 mg/m^{3}
Safety data sheet (SDS)	ICSC 0671

Related compounds
Other anions	Potassium cyanate; Potassium thiocyanate
Other cations	Hydrogen cyanide; Lithium cyanide; Sodium cyanide; Rubidium cyanide; Caesium cyanide
Related compounds	Acetonitrile
- Except where otherwise noted, data are given for materials in their standard state (at 25 °C [77 °F], 100 kPa). verify (what is ?) Infobox references

Potassium cyanide is a compound with the formula KCN. It is a colorless salt, similar in appearance to sugar, that is highly soluble in water. Most KCN is used in gold mining, organic synthesis, and electroplating. Smaller applications include chemical gilding and buffing of jewelry. Potassium cyanide is highly toxic, and a dose of 200 to 300 milligrams will kill nearly any human.

The moist solid emits small amounts of hydrogen cyanide due to hydrolysis (reaction with water). Hydrogen cyanide is often described as having an odor resembling that of bitter almonds.

The taste of potassium cyanide has been described as acrid and bitter, with a burning sensation similar to lye. However, potassium cyanide kills so rapidly its taste has not been reliably documented. In 2006, an Indian man killed himself using potassium cyanide. In the suicide note he left, the final words written were that potassium cyanide "burns the tongue and tastes acrid".

== Production ==
KCN is produced by treating hydrogen cyanide with an aqueous solution of potassium hydroxide, followed by evaporation of the solution in a vacuum:

HCN + KOH → KCN + H_{2}O

About 50,000 short tons (45,000,000 kg) of potassium cyanide are produced yearly.

=== Historical production ===
Before 1900 and the invention of the Castner process, potassium cyanide was the most important source of alkali metal cyanides. In this historical process, potassium cyanide was produced by decomposing potassium ferrocyanide:

K_{4}[Fe(CN)_{6}] → 4 KCN + FeC_{2} + N_{2}

== Structure ==
In aqueous solution, KCN is dissociated into hydrated potassium (K^{+}) ions and cyanide (CN^{−}) ions. As a solid, KCN has structure resembling sodium chloride: with each potassium ion surrounded by six cyanide ions, and vice versa. Despite being diatomic, and thus less symmetric than chloride, the cyanide ions rotate so rapidly that their time-averaged shape is spherical. At low temperature and high pressure, this free rotation is hindered, resulting in a less symmetric crystal structure with the cyanide ions arranged in sheets.

== Applications ==
KCN and sodium cyanide (NaCN) are widely used in organic synthesis for the preparation of nitriles and carboxylic acids, particularly in the von Richter reaction. It also finds use for the synthesis of hydantoins, which can be useful synthetic intermediates, when reacted with a carbonyl compound such as an aldehyde or ketone in the presence of ammonium carbonate.

KCN is used as a photographic fixer in the wet plate collodion process. The KCN dissolves silver where it has not been made insoluble by the developer. This reveals and stabilizes the image, making it no longer sensitive to light. Modern wet plate photographers may prefer less toxic fixers, often opting for sodium thiosulfate, but KCN is still used.

In the 19th century, cyanogen soap, a preparation containing potassium cyanide, was used by photographers to remove silver stains from their hands.

=== Potassium gold cyanide ===
In gold mining, KCN forms the water-soluble salt potassium gold cyanide (or gold potassium cyanide) and potassium hydroxide from gold metal in the presence of oxygen (usually from the surrounding air) and water:

4 Au + 8 KCN + O_{2} + 2 H_{2}O → 4 K[Au(CN)_{2}] + 4 KOH

=== Analytical chemistry ===
In analytical chemistry, potassium cyanide is used as complexing agent for chemical analysis of zinc in water and wastewater. The cyanide group complexes zinc and other heavy metals, which is separated and analyzed in a spectro-photometer.

== Toxicity ==
Potassium cyanide is a potent inhibitor of cellular respiration, acting on mitochondrial cytochrome c oxidase, hence blocking oxidative phosphorylation. Lactic acidosis then occurs as a consequence of anaerobic metabolism. Initially, acute cyanide poisoning causes a red or ruddy complexion in the victim because the tissues are not able to use the oxygen in the blood. The effects of potassium cyanide and sodium cyanide are identical, and symptoms of poisoning typically occur within a few minutes of ingesting the substance: the person loses consciousness, and brain death eventually follows. During this period the victim may suffer convulsions. Death is caused by histotoxic hypoxia/cerebral hypoxia. The expected LD100 dose (human) for potassium cyanide is 200–300 mg while the median lethal dose (LD50) is estimated at 140 mg.

== Disposal ==
Due to toxicity considerations, the disposal of cyanide is subject to stringent regulations. Industrial cyanide effluent is typically destroyed by oxidation using peroxysulfuric acid, hydrogen peroxide, sulfur dioxide/copper salts ("Inco process") or all three ("Combiox Process"). Use of sodium hypochlorite, traditional for laboratory-scale wastes, is impractical on a commercial scale. Hydrolysis at higher temperatures is highly effective, but requires specialized equipment. Lastly, cyanide wastes can be acidified for recovery of hydrogen cyanide.
