= Peroxysulfuric acid =

Peroxysulfuric acid can refer to either of these chemical compounds:

- Peroxymonosulfuric acid, H_{2}SO_{5}
- Peroxydisulfuric acid, H_{2}S_{2}O_{8}
