= Sodium cyanide =

Toxic chemical compound (NaCN)

- Sodium cyanide bonding

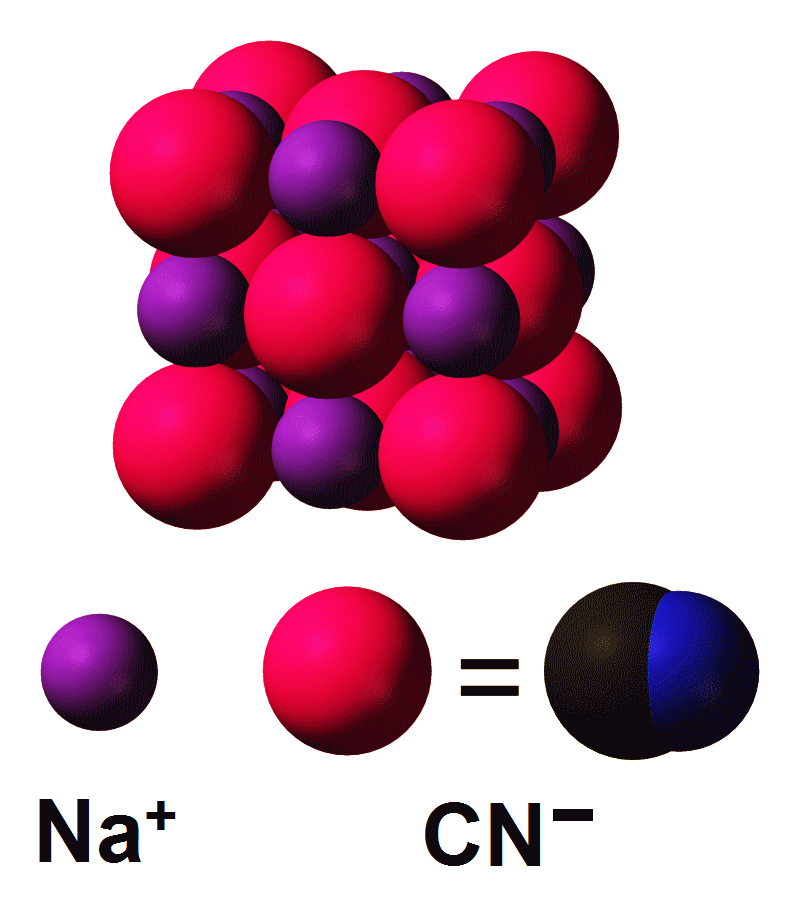

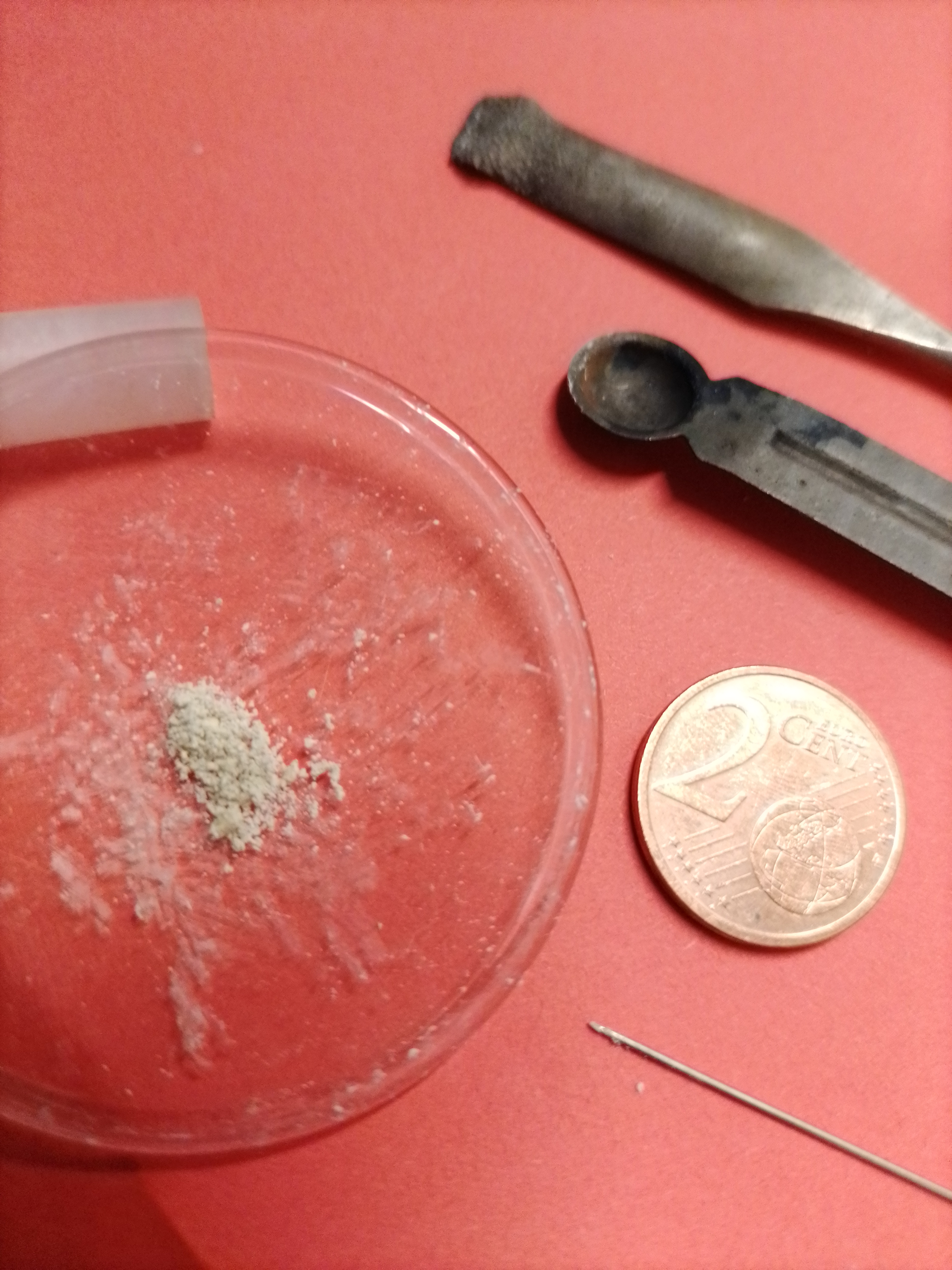

Identifiers
CAS Number	143-33-9
3D model (JSmol)	Interactive image
ChEMBL	ChEMBL1644697
ChemSpider	8587
ECHA InfoCard	100.005.091
EC Number	205-599-4
PubChem CID	8929
RTECS number	VZ7525000
UNII	O5DDB9Z95G
UN number	1689
CompTox Dashboard (EPA)	DTXSID4024309
- InChI: InChI=1S/CN.Na/c1-2;/q-1;+1 Key: MNWBNISUBARLIT-UHFFFAOYSA-N; InChI=1S/CN.Na/c1-2;/q-1;+1 Key: MNWBNISUBARLIT-UHFFFAOYAG
- SMILES: [C-]#N.[Na+]

Properties
Chemical formula	NaCN
Molar mass	49.008 g·mol^{−1}
Appearance	white solid
Odor	faint bitter almond-like
Density	1.5955 g/cm^{3}
Melting point	563.7 °C (1,046.7 °F; 836.9 K)
Boiling point	1,496 °C (2,725 °F; 1,769 K)
Solubility in water	48.15 g/100 mL (10 °C); 63.7 g/100 mL (25 °C)
Solubility	soluble in ammonia, methanol, ethanol very slightly soluble in dimethylformamide, SO_{2} insoluble in dimethyl sulfoxide
Refractive index (n_{D})	1.452

Thermochemistry
Heat capacity (C)	70.4 J·mol^{−1}·K^{−1}
Std molar entropy (S^{⦵}_{298})	115.6 J·mol^{−1}·K^{−1}
Std enthalpy of formation (Δ_{f}H^{⦵}_{298})	−87.5 kJ·mol^{−1}
Gibbs free energy (Δ_{f}G^{⦵})	−76.4 kJ·mol^{−1}
Enthalpy of fusion (Δ_{f}H^{⦵}_{fus})	8.79 kJ·mol^{−1}

Hazards
- GHS labelling
Pictograms	(GHS06: Toxic) (GHS09: Environmental hazard)
NFPA 704 (fire diamond)	4 0 0
Flash point	Non-flammable
- Lethal dose or concentration (LD, LC)
LD_{50} (median dose)	4 mg/kg (sheep, oral); 15 mg/kg (mammal, oral); 8 mg/kg (rat, oral)
- NIOSH (US health exposure limits)
PEL (Permissible)	TWA 5 mg/m^{3}
REL (Recommended)	C 5 mg/m^{3} (4.7 ppm) [10-minute]
IDLH (Immediate danger)	25 mg/m^{3} (as CN)
Safety data sheet (SDS)	ICSC 1118

Related compounds
Other cations	Potassium cyanide
Related compounds	Hydrogen cyanide
- Except where otherwise noted, data are given for materials in their standard state (at 25 °C [77 °F], 100 kPa). verify (what is ?) Infobox references

Sodium cyanide is a compound with the formula NaCN and the structure Na^{+} ^{−}C≡N. It is a white, water-soluble solid. Cyanide has a high affinity for metals, which leads to the high toxicity of this salt. Its main application, in gold mining, also exploits its high reactivity toward metals. It is a moderately strong base.

== Production and chemical properties ==
Sodium cyanide is produced by treating hydrogen cyanide with sodium hydroxide:

HCN + NaOH → NaCN + H_{2}O

Worldwide production was estimated at 500,000 tons in the year 2006. Formerly it was prepared by the Castner process involving the reaction of sodium amide with carbon at elevated temperatures.

NaNH_{2} + C → NaCN + H_{2}

The structure of solid NaCN is related to that of sodium chloride. The anions and cations are each six-coordinate. Potassium cyanide (KCN) adopts a similar structure.

When treated with acid, it forms the toxic gas hydrogen cyanide:

NaCN + H^{+} → HCN + Na^{+}

Because the salt is derived from a weak acid, sodium cyanide readily reverts to HCN by hydrolysis; the moist solid emits small amounts of hydrogen cyanide, which is thought to smell like bitter almonds (not everyone can smell it—the ability thereof is due to a genetic trait). Sodium cyanide reacts rapidly with strong acids to release hydrogen cyanide. This dangerous process represents a significant risk associated with cyanide salts. It is detoxified most efficiently with hydrogen peroxide (H_{2}O_{2}) to produce sodium cyanate (NaOCN) and water:

NaCN + H_{2}O_{2} → NaOCN + H_{2}O

== Applications ==
=== Cyanide mining ===
Gold cyanidation (also known as the cyanide process) is the dominant technique for extracting gold, much of which is obtained from low-grade ore. More than 70% of cyanide consumption globally is used for this purpose. The application exploits the high affinity of gold(I) for cyanide, which induces gold metal to oxidize and dissolve in the presence of air (oxygen) and water, producing the salt sodium dicyanoaurate (or sodium gold cyanide) (NaAu(CN)_{2}):

4 Au + 8 NaCN + O_{2} + 2 H_{2}O → 4 Na[Au(CN)_{2}] + 4 NaOH

A similar process uses potassium cyanide (KCN, a close relative of sodium cyanide) to produce potassium dicyanoaurate (KAu(CN)_{2}).

These soluble forms of gold (and silver) can be converted back to the metals by electrolysis.

=== Chemical feedstock ===
Some commercially significant chemicals are derived from cyanide: cyanuric chloride, cyanogen chloride, and cyanogen.

Several specialty nitriles may be produced by alkylation of cyanide, a strong nucleophile. Illustrative is the synthesis of benzyl cyanide by the reaction of benzyl chloride and sodium cyanide:

C_{6}H_{5}CH_{2}Cl + NaCN → C_{6}H_{5}CH_{2}CN + NaCl

=== Electroplating ===
Cyanide baths (solutions) of metal ions are used to electroplate many metals, including platinum, gold, and silver. Cadmium plating gives excellent corrosion resistance and is achieved using cadmium oxide and sodium cyanide. Copper 'strikes' (thin high quality layers) are traditionally formed using cyanide electroplating, these thin interstitial layers allow adhesion between metals that are usually incompatible, such as chromium and aluminium.

=== Niche uses ===
Being highly toxic, sodium cyanide is used to kill or stun rapidly such as in collecting jars used by entomologists and in widely illegal cyanide fishing.

It was used as an insecticide, rodenticide and antibacterial, but these uses were cancelled by the EPA in 1987.

== Toxicity ==
Sodium cyanide, like other soluble cyanide salts, is among the most rapidly acting of all known poisons. NaCN is a potent inhibitor of cellular respiration, acting on mitochondrial cytochrome oxidase and hence blocking electron transport. This results in decreased oxidative metabolism and oxygen utilization. Lactic acidosis then occurs as a consequence of anaerobic metabolism. An oral dosage as small as 200–300 mg can be fatal.

== Disposal ==
Due to toxicity considerations, the disposal of cyanide is subject to stringent regulations. Industrial cyanide effluent is typically destroyed by oxidation using peroxysulfuric acid, hydrogen peroxide, sulfur dioxide/copper salts ("Inco process") or all three ("Combiox Process"). Use of sodium hypochlorite, traditional for laboratory-scale wastes, is impractical on a commercial scale. Hydrolysis at higher temperatures is highly effective, but requires specialized equipment. Lastly, cyanide wastes can be acidified for recovery of hydrogen cyanide.
