= Delphine (given name) =

Delphine is a feminine Francophone given name, a form of the Latin Delphina, meaning woman from Delphi, the "Navel of the Earth" or "Womb of Gaia", home of the Pythia, high priestess and oracle of the Temple of Apollo, the then most prestigious and authoritative oracle for the Ancient Greeks, and among the most powerful women of the classical world from 7th century BC until the late 4th century AD.

Thus "Delphine" also means originally "who or which pertains to the oracle" i.e. provider of insight, wise counsel or prophetic predictions. In modern language, it also means "who or which pertains to the womb or the dolphin", the Greek sanctuary location taking its own name from the words δελφύς delphús (womb) and δελφίς delphís (dolphin i.e "fish with a womb" which gave the latin delphinus), thanks to an Appollonian myth about Zeus deciding on its location and travelling from Crete to establish it whilst changed into a dolphin, which were also trusted companions and frequent messengers for various gods in mythology.

Notable people with the name (in various spellings) or derivatives include:

- Delphine Arnault (born 1975), French businesswoman, director and executive vice president of Louis Vuitton (LVMH Group)
- Delphine Arnould de Cool-Fortin (1830-1921), French painter and arts teacher
- Delphine Atangana (born 1984), Cameroonian sprinter who specialized in the 100 metres
- Delphine Bardin (born 1974), French classical pianist
- Delphine Batho (born 1973), French politician
- Delphine Bernard (born 1986), former French wheelchair fencer in foil, épée and sabre, now a parasports TV consultant
- Delphine Biscaye, French mechanical engineer and designer, former Venturi Formula E Team Manager, now F1 Academy Competition Manager
- Delphine Blanc (born 1983), French football player
- Princess Delphine of Belgium (born 1968 as Delphine Boël), illegitimate daughter of King Albert II of Belgium and Baroness Sybille de Selys Longchamps
- Delphine Cascarino (born 1997), French professional football player, 5-time UEFA Women's Champions League winner
- Delphine Chanéac (born 1978), French actress and DJ
- Delphine Claudel (born 1996), French cross-country skier
- Delphine Combe (born 1974), French sprinter
- Delphine de Custine (1770–1826), French literary and society figure
- Delphine Delrue (born 1998), French badminton player
- Delphine Depardieu (born 1979), French actress
- Delphine Diallo (born 1977), Brooklyn-based French-Senegalese photographer
- Delphine Djiraibe (born 1960), Chadian attorney, co-founder of the Chadian Association for the Promotion and Defense of Human Rights and the Public Interest Law Center (PILC)
- Delphine Ernotte (born 1966), French businesswoman
- Delphine Fitz Darby (1902–1995), American art historian
- Delphine Galou (born 1977), French-born contralto
- Delphine Gény-Stephann (born 1968), French engineer, former Secretary of State under Minister of Economy and Finance Bruno Le Maire
- Delphine Girard (born 1990), Belgian-Canadian screenwriter and film director
- Delphine de Girardin (1804–1855), French author under the pen name Vicomte Delaunay
- Delphine Gleize (born 1973), French film director and screenwriter
- Delphine of Glandèves, (died 1358) a 14th-century nun from Provence
- Delphine Hanna (1854–1941), American physical education professor
- Delphyne Heymann (born 1966), French biathlete
- Delphine Horvilleur (born 1974), prominent French rabbi, co-leader of the Liberal Jewish Movement of France
- Delphine Klopfenstein Broggini (born 1976), Swiss politician
- Delphine Lannuzel (born 1978), Australian sea ice biogeochemist, professor at the Institute for Marine and Antarctic Studies (IMAS), University of Tasmania
- Delphine LaLaurie (1787–1849), New Orleans socialite and serial killer
- Delphine Lecompte (born 1978), Flemish poet
- Delphine Philippe-Lemaître (1798–1863), French historian, archaeologist, botanist
- Delphine Levy (1969–2020), French manager of cultural institutions
- Delphine Lingemann (born 1972), French politician
- Delphine Medjo (1941–2016), Cameroonian politician
- Delphine Menant (born 1850-1932), French explorer and ethnologist, daughter of famous orientalist Joachim Menant and pupil of James Darmesteter
- Delphine Minoui (born 1974), French-Iranian investigative journalist, social scientist and author
- Delphine Neid, a bassist in the band The Nuns
- Delphine Nkansa (born 2001), Belgian track and field athlete
- Delphine O (born 1985), French-Korean politician and former MP for Paris for Renaissance
- Delphine Oggeri (born 1973), French ski mountaineer
- Delphine Parrott (1928–2016), British endocrinologist, immunologist, and academic
- Delphyne Peretto (born 1982), French biathlete
- Delfina Potocka (1807–1877), Polish countess, a friend and muse to artists Frédéric Chopin and Zygmunt Krasiński
- Delphine Py-Bilot (born 1979), professional French triathlete
- Delphine Red Shirt (born 1957), Native American author and educator
- Delphine Seyrig (1932–1990), French actress
- Delphine Anderson Squires (1868-1961), American suffragist and journalist
- Delphine Ugalde (1829–1910), French soprano, composer and theatre manager, mother of mezzo-soprano Marguerite Ugalde
- Delphine de Vigan (born 1966), Award-winning French novelist
- Delphine Wespiser (born 1992), Miss Alsace 2011 and Miss France 2012
- Delaphine Grace Wyckoff (1906–2001), American microbiologist and educator
- Delphine Zanga Tsogo (1935–2020), Cameroonian writer and politician

== Fictional characters ==
- Delphine d'Albémar, titular heroine in the eponymous Delphine, infamous epistolary novel by Germaine de Staël
- Delphine de Nucingen, recurrent character in Honoré de Balzac's La Comédie Humaine
- Delphine, one of the two young farmgirls, Delphine and Marinette, narrating their adventures in Marcel Aymé's Les Contes du Chat Perché (1934-1946) - translated in English as The Magic Pictures and The Wonderful Farm.
- Captain Delphine Angua von Überwald, a character from Terry Pratchett's Discworld
- Delphyne Gorgon, Amazon appearing in American comic books published by Marvel Comics, making its debut in The Incredible Hercules #121 (Sept. 2008)
- Delphine, a character in Power Rangers
- Delphine, a character in the 2011 game The Elder Scrolls V: Skyrim
- Delphine Cormier, a character on Orphan Black played by Évelyne Brochu
- Delphine Lasalle, undercover French intelligence agent in the 2017 film Atomic Blonde
- Delphine Day, a character from ITV's Mr Selfridge
- Delphine Donkey, a character in the British children's cartoon Peppa Pig
- Delphine, the Gaul friend, a character from ITV TV series Plebs
- Delphine Watzka, the protagonist of the 2003 novel The Master Butchers Singing Club
- Delphine Gaither, the narrator of Rita Williams-Garcia's 2010 novel One Crazy Summer and its sequels.
- Delphine Lacroix, a character from Netflix's TV series Anne with an E

== See also ==
- Belle Delphine (born 1999) South African-born English internet celebrity, pornographic actress, model, and YouTuber
- Delphine (disambiguation)
- Delphyne
