= Delphin (disambiguation) =

Delphin was a German midget submarine created during World War II.

Delphin may also refer to:

- Delphin, a Latin word and root meaning "dolphin" (also delphinus)
- Delphin, Greek sea god, the leader of the dolphins, Poseidon placed him in the sky as the constellation Delphinus
- Delphin (molecule), an anthocyanin (Delphinidin-3,5-O-diglucoside)
- Delphin Classics, a large edition of the Latin classics
- Dornier Delphin, a 1920s German single-engined commercial flying boat
- DELPH-IN, a collaboration where computational linguists worldwide developing natural language processing tools for deep linguistic processing of human language
- MV Delphin, a cruise ship owned by the India-based Vishal Cruises Pvt. Ltd.
- FV Delphin, a West German fishing vessel in service 1952-58
- Operation Delphin, an anti-partisan operation in Croatia during World War II

== People ==
- Delphin Enjolras (1857–1945), French academic painter
- Delphin Kyubwa, Congolese politician
- Delphin Strungk (1600/1601–1694), German composer and organist
- Delphin Tshiembe (born 1991), Congolese footballer
- Otto Delphin Amundsen (1896–1957), Norwegian genealogist
- Miriam Delphin-Rittmon, American psychologist

== See also ==
- Delfin (disambiguation)
- Delphine (disambiguation)
- Delphinine, an alkaloid
- Jean-Delphin
