= Voegeli =

Voegeli is a surname. Notable people with the surname include:

- C. Alfred Voegeli (1904–1984), American bishop of the Episcopal Diocese of Haiti
- Franz Anton Voegeli (1825–1874), Swiss chemist
- Marthe Voegeli (active 1921–1950), Swiss physician
