= Delphine =

Delphine may refer to:

- Delphine (given name), list of people with the feminine given name
- Delphine (novel), an 1802 novel by Germaine de Staël
- Delphine (1931 film), a 1931 French film directed by Roger Capellani
- Delphine (2019 film), a 2019 Canadian film directed by Chloé Robichaud
- SS Delphine, a yacht built in 1921 by John and Horace Dodge
- Delphine Records, a French record label founded in 1976
- Delphine Software International, a defunct game development company
- Of or relating to dolphins
- Moderate Tropical Storm Delphine, in the 1969–70 South-West Indian Ocean cyclone season

== See also ==
- Delphin (disambiguation)
- Delphian (disambiguation)
- Delphinine, an alkaloid
- Delphyne, a mythological monster
- Uterus didelphys, a uterine malformation
