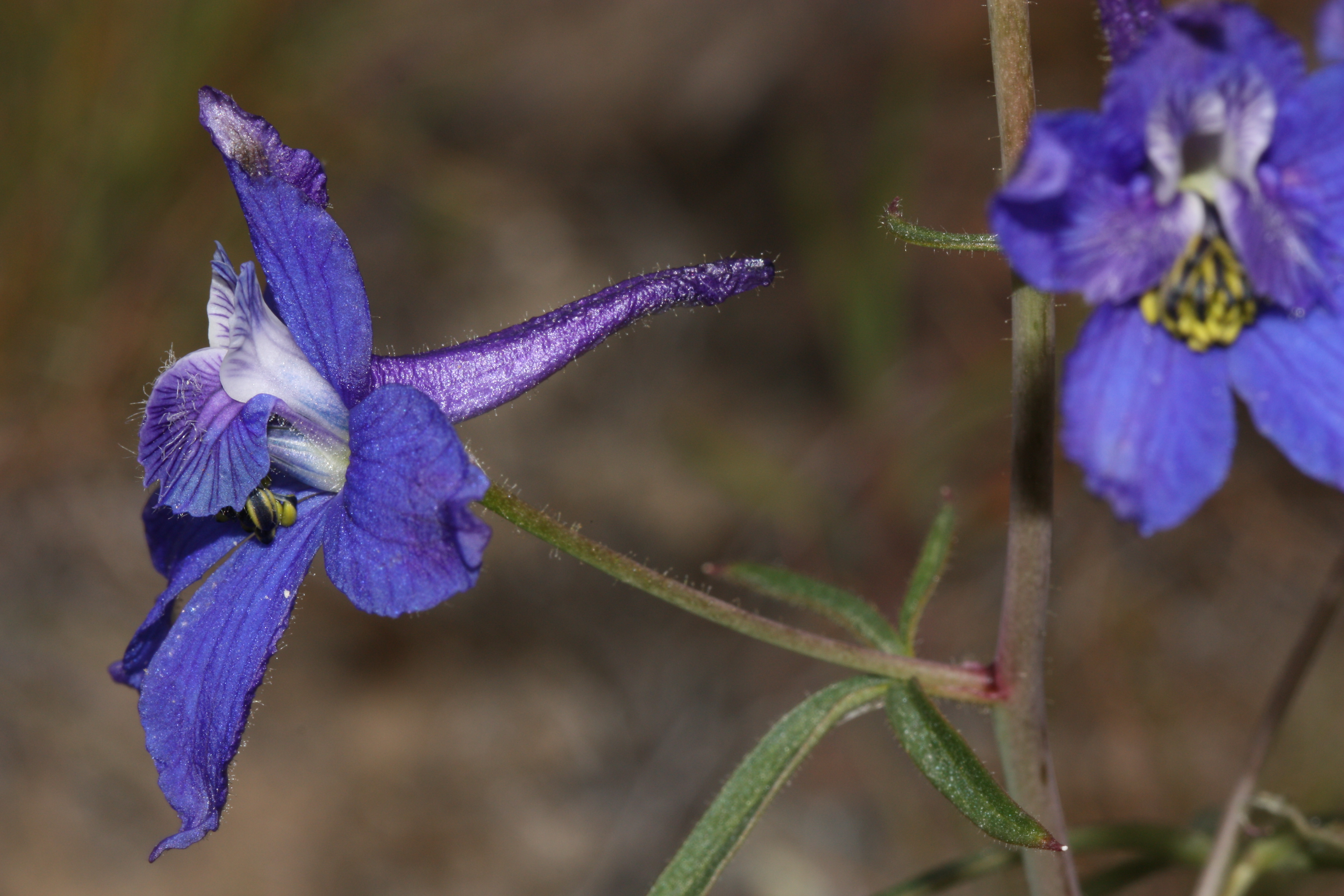
- Delphinium nuttallianum

Scientific classification
- Kingdom: Plantae
- Clade: Tracheophytes
- Clade: Angiosperms
- Clade: Eudicots
- Order: Ranunculales
- Family: Ranunculaceae
- Subfamily: Ranunculoideae
- Tribe: Delphinieae; Schrödinger

= Delphinieae =

Tribe of flowering plants

Delphinieae is a tribe of flowering plants in the family Ranunculaceae. It comprises 4 genera found in Eurasia, North America, and Africa.

== Description ==
Some species are perennial, whereas others are annual. The leaves are palmate with alternate (spiral) phyllotaxis. The inflorescences are racemose, typically with blue flowers. The flowers have five sepals and a zygomorphic shape. That is, the flowers are symmetrical in only one plane. In most species, the inner petals, which are reduced and completely enclosed by the sepal whorl, have a pair of nectar spurs that force pollinators to move back and forth to get nectar from both spurs. The petals are also dorsally spurred. Flowers tend to have many stamens. Flowers have varying numbers of carpels: 3 in Staphisagria, 3–5 in Aconitum, 6–13 in Gymnaconitum, 1 in Delphinium subg. Consolida, and 3–5 in other subgenera of Delphinium. The flowers are protandrous, meaning that they are male before they are female. Additionally, the flowers are herkogamous: the anthers and stigma are spatially separated. In the western Mediterranean, species tend to be xenogamous. Some species are strictly xenogamous. Others, especially annuals or species in the genus Staphisagria, are more able to self-fertilize. Species that self-fertilize more frequently tend to have less complex flowers with fewer stamens and fewer carpels.

== Taxonomy ==
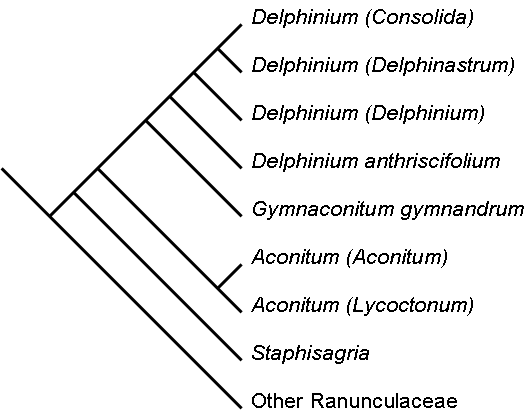
Relationship between members of the tribe Delphinieae

Before the 21st century, the tribe Delphinieae included the genera Aconitum L., Delphinium L., Consolida (DC.) S. F. Gray, and Aconitella Spach. However, classification has since been revised on the basis of molecular data. Aconitella and Consolida are now considered part of Delphinium. Delphinium subg. Staphisagria is now considered its own genus, Staphisagria. Aconitum gymnandrum has been placed in its own genus, Gymnaconitum.

Nigelleae is the tribe most closely related to Delphinieae. It is estimated that Staphisagria diverged from the rest of the Delphinieae tribe about 32.5 million years ago during the Oligocene.

== Distribution ==
Species of Delphinieae are found in Eurasia and North America, with some species in Africa. Delphinieae have a center of diversity in the Himalayas.

== Ecology ==
The vast majority of Delphinieae are pollinated by bumblebees, but some species are also pollinated by flies, butterflies and moths, other bees, and (in North America) hummingbirds. Most Aconitum and Delphinium species are highly toxic. Staphisagria macrosperma is also toxic.
