= Delphian =

Delphian can refer to:

- Delphi, an ancient Greek sanctuary and home of a well-known oracle
- Delphian, one of the ancient Greek dialects
- Delphian, a Dutch progressive metal band
- Delphian (typeface)
- Delphian League, an English amateur football league
- Delphian Records, a record label based in Edinburgh, Scotland
- The Delphian School, the founding school of Delphi Schools
- The Delphian Society, founded in 1910 to promote the education of women in the United States
- The Delphian Club, an early American literary club active between 1816 and 1825

== See also ==
- Delphine (disambiguation)
