= Delphine Biscaye =

French mechanical engineer and designer

- Born: France
- Education: French Institute of Advanced Mechanics
- Occupations: Mechanical engineer Designer
- Years active: 2000s–present

Delphine Biscaye is a French mechanical engineer and designer who serves as team and logistics manager of the Venturi Formula E team. Coming from a background where none of her family had any involvement or interest in motor racing, she studied at French Institute of Advanced Mechanics. Biscaye was employed by Williams Grand Prix Engineering on an intermittent basis at its kinetic energy recovery system research and development department and later helped in the design of the FW31's suspension. She travelled back to France after she could not get full-time employment with Williams and joined Venturi Automobiles in December 2009 as a research and development engineer and CAD designer on its sports car prototype programme.

In early 2011, Biscaye was made project manager of the all-electric four-wheel drive Buckeye Bullet project and was later assigned to the Antarctica programme as a designer in July 2012. Venturi assigned her to its Formula E racing operation as logistics officer at the start of the 2015/16 season. Biscaye was appointed permanent team and logistics manager from the 2016/17 season. Her time in the position has seen Venturi establish partnerships with motorsports specialists HWA GmbH and car parts maker ZF Friedrichshafen.

== Early life and education ==
Biscaye was raised in a small village in France. She is one of three children in her family and has two brothers. Biscaye came from a background where none of her family were neither involved nor interested in motor racing. She got interested in the industry through watching Formula One and rallying. During an interview with the lecturers of the Clermont-Ferrand-based mechanical engineering school French Institute of Advanced Mechanics (now SIGMA Clemont) in 2005, she was told a job in motor sport was not feasible since other interviewees had the same ambition and jobs in the industry were scarce. Biscaye said of the setback in a 2018 interview, "Looking back, I think that's what made me more determined – because it was more difficult, I had a greater desire to succeed, so I worked very hard to prove that I could do it."

Nevertheless, she contacted several teams who competed in Formula One and the Le Mans Series. Biscaye later stopped her search when the Williams Grand Prix Engineering Formula One team agreed to employ her. She worked for the team for half a year in 2008 and returned for another four months in February 2009 after graduating from the French Institute of Advanced Mechanics with a degree in mechanical engineering. Williams later employed her as a contractor on a contractual basis until the end of the year. During her time at Williams, Biscaye worked in the team's design office to help develop its kinetic energy recovery system technology in their research and development department and then focused on the suspension for the FW31 chassis. She also had a placement at University of Canterbury as a post-doctorate assistant where she designed and tested a new rapid prototype system. Biscaye travelled back to France after she could not get Williams to employ her on a permanent basis when her contract ended and sought alternative work.

== Venturi ==
Biscaye was employed by Venturi Automobiles in December 2009 as a research and development engineer and a computer aided designer on the company's sports car prototype programme. In her first years at Venturi, she also took a course in Sociology at the University of Strasbourg. In early 2011, Biscaye was made project manager of the fully-electric four-wheel drive Buckeye Bullet (VBB 3) vehicle. It is a joint programme established by Venturi with students of Ohio State University intended to establish new land speed records at the Bonneville Speedway in the U.S. state of Utah. From July 2012 until 2016, she was assigned to work in the Antarctica programme as a designer, an electric vehicle intended to provide scientists access to research zones considered to be un-reachable with internal combustion machinery.

=== Formula E ===
After working in these departments, Venturi assigned Biscaye to its FIA Formula E Championship racing operation as logistics officer and worked from its headquarters in Monaco at the start of the 2015/16 season. She attended the 2016 Long Beach ePrix as temporary team manager. From the beginning of the 2016/17 season, Biscaye was appointed permanent team and logistics manager. She aimed to raise the spirit within Venturi and form a unified operation through improved communication and management. Biscaye's position entails ensuring that the cars meet technical regulations, scheduling for employees, arguing the case for drivers if they have been summoned to the stewards office to answer for an incident and debriefing engineers and mechanics after the race meeting ends. During her time, Venturi established partnerships with motorsports specialists HWA GmbH and car parts maker ZF Friedrichshafen.
