= Sodium fusion test =

Test used in elemental analysis

The sodium fusion test, or Lassaigne's test, is used in elemental analysis for the qualitative determination of the presence of foreign elements, namely halogens, nitrogen, and sulfur, in an organic compound. It was developed by J. L. Lassaigne.

The test involves heating the sample with sodium metal, "fusing" it with the sample. A variety of techniques has been described. The "fused" sample is plunged into water, and the qualitative tests are performed on the resultant solution for the respective possible constituents.

== Theory ==
The halogens, nitrogen, and sulfur are covalently bonded to the organic compounds are converted to various sodium salts formed during the fusion. Typically proposed reactions are:

Na + C + N → NaCN
Na + C + N + S → NaSCN
2Na + S → Na_{2}S
Na + X → NaX

The fate of the hydrocarbon portion of the sample is disregarded.

The aqueous extract is called sodium fusion extract or Lassaigne's extract.

=== Test for nitrogen ===
The sodium fusion extract is made alkaline by adding NaOH. To this mixture, freshly prepared FeSO_{4} solution is added and boiled for some time and then cooled. A few drops of FeCl_{3} are added and Prussian blue (bluish green) color forms due to formation of ferric ferrocyanide along with NaCl. This shows the presence of nitrogen in the organic compound.
$$\ce{6CN- +Fe^2+ -> [Fe(CN)6]^4-}$$
$$\ce{{3[Fe(CN)6]}^{4-} +4Fe^3+ ->[\ce{xH2O}]Fe4[Fe(CN)6]3\cdot xH2O}$$

=== Test for sulfur ===
==== Lead acetate test ====
The sodium fusion extract is acidified with acetic acid and lead acetate is added to it. A black precipitate of lead sulfide indicates the presence of sulfur.

==== Sodium nitroprusside test ====
Freshly prepared sodium nitroprusside solution is added to the sodium fusion extract, turning the solution deep violet due to formation of sodium thionitroprusside.

$\ce{S^2- + [Fe(CN)5NO]^2- -> [Fe(CN)5NOS]^4-}$

In case, both nitrogen and sulfur are present in an organic compound, sodium thiocyanate is formed which gives blood red color since there are no free cyanide ions.

$\ce{Fe^3+ + SCN- -> [Fe(SCN)]^2+}$

=== Test for halogens ===
The sodium fusion extract is boiled with concentrated HNO_{3} followed by the addition of AgNO_{3} solution which yields a white (AgCl) or yellow (AgBr or AgI) precipitate if halogen is present.

$\ce{NaX + AgNO3 -> AgX + NaNO3}$

=== Test for phosphorus ===
Sodium peroxide is added to the compound to oxidise phosphorus to sodium phosphate. It is boiled with concentrated HNO_{3} and then ammonium molybdate is added. A yellow precipitate (ammonium phosphomolybdate) indicates the presence of phosphorus.

$\ce{Na3PO4 + 3HNO3 -> H3PO4 + 3NaNO3}$

$\ce{H3PO4 + 21HNO3 + 12(NH4)2MoO4 -> (NH4)3[P(Mo3 O10)4] + 21NH4NO3 + 12H2O}$
