= Heat-based contraception =

Male contraceptive method

An alternative male contraceptive method involves heating the testicles so that they cannot produce sperm. Sperm are best produced at a temperature slightly below body temperature. The muscles around a male's scrotum involuntarily tighten if the man's body temperature drops, and they loosen, allowing the testes to hang, if the body temperature rises. This is the body's way of keeping the sperm at an ideal temperature. This means that sperm production can be disrupted with increased temperature. Some suggest exposure to high temperatures (116 °F equal to 47 °C) can affect fertility for months.

Male thermal contraceptive methods (MTC) derive their effectiveness from the alteration of the thermoregulatory function of the scrotum. When this function is altered – by wearing tight underwear, being exposed to a high outside temperature, or by developing a fever, fertility may be impaired.

Methods used include hot water applied to the scrotum, heat generated by ultrasound, and artificial cryptorchidism (holding the testicles inside the abdomen) using specialized briefs. One of the initial experiments resulted in partial infertility lasting more than four years. Initial experiments suggest it is effective and safe, though there have not been long-term studies to determine if it has any side effects on the body after reversal.

== History ==
The deleterious effect of hyperthermia on male fertility has been known since ancient times. A history of testicular descent problems (cryptorchidism) or professional practices that lead to elevated scrotal temperature and even fever have been known factors of reduced fertility. But it is from the 19th century onwards that the scientific community started to carry out research to better understand the phenomenon.

In the 1930s, physician Marthe Voegeli explored the role of heat in male sterilization. She conducted experiments on the relationship between heat and spermatogenesis. She found that exposing the testicles to high temperatures in hot baths altered fertility. Sperm concentrations in the volunteers decreased so much so that they were considered infertile. She was the first scientist to popularize this alternative method of contraception for men. Thermal dependence of spermatogenesis was studied in 1941 with external heat such as hot baths or saunas with temperatures above 40 °C over short periods of exposure.

The thermal dependence of spermatogenesis was confirmed in various studies carried out between 1950 and 1970 by doctors Watanabe and Robinson. In the 1960s Studies have been carried out with daily exposure of the testicles to less intense heat, around 37 °C, a temperature that is close to that of the body.

In 1999, a contraceptive device using body heat was patented by Andreas Schopp.

== How it works ==
The production of sperm can be disrupted with a rise in temperature.

Thermal methods involve heating the testicles so that sperm production is slowed down. The spermatozoa are thus produced at a slightly lower temperature than that of the body, 1 to 2 °C below 37 °C.

The cremaster muscle covers the testicles. It works involuntarily. Its role is to bring the testicles down if the body temperature rises or to raise them if the body temperature drops. This process allows it to regulate the temperature of the testicles and to keep it several degrees lower than that of the body in order to enable an ideal spermatogenesis.

Other effects have also been observed, such as a decrease in motility and an alteration in the morphological characteristics of the spermatozoa that are produced.

Some suggest that exposure to high temperatures (47 °C) can affect fertility for months.

== Efficacy ==
Thermal methods do not cause azoospermia, but a reduction of the spermatozoa below the contraceptive threshold considered to be effective.

This contraceptive threshold was defined in 2007 for male thermal, chemical and hormonal contraception methods. It corresponds to 1 million spermatozoa per milliliter per ejaculate.

The only method that has been tested on enough volunteers to establish that the effectiveness of thermal male contraception is satisfactory is the artificial cryptorchidism method with testicular ascent using a specific device. During the clinical studies, 50 couples were followed over 537 cycles of pregnancy. Only one resulted in a pregnancy due to a misuse of the technique. The Pearl Index would therefore be less than 0.5 and this contraception method can be considered effective according to the standards of the World Health Organisation (WHO).

== Adverse effects ==
The maximum limit of exposure to heat is around 45 °C, which causes the coagulation of intracellular proteins on living cells. However, exposure above 41 °C for short periods of time may be used, as has been the case for scientific studies on the effect of hot baths.

In the case of artificial cryptorchidism or thermal insulation of the testicles, the use of a temperature close to that of the body (37 °C) has made it possible to increase the time of exposure in order to slow down the spermatogenesis process over longer periods, 4 years in a row at most. To date, only a decrease in testicular volume by a few percents has been observed during the contraceptive period. There is no evidence of an increased risk of testicular torsion. However, it has been shown that the nuclear quality of the spermatozoa was altered during the phase of inhibition of the spermatogenesis, but that this was reversible 3 months after the subject stops practicing artificial cryptorchidism. This finding should be taken into account when using this contraception method, during the inhibition phase and for 3 months after treatment discontinuation.

== Methods ==
=== Hot baths ===
Within a few months of daily exposure, the number of spermatozoa drops provided the temperature is higher than that of the body: 38 to 46 °C instead of 37 °C.

=== Artificial cryptorchidism ===
The principle of artificial cryptorchidism or male thermal contraception with testicle lifting is simple.

Warming the testicles with body heat by keeping them in the inguinal sack for several hours a day reduces sperm production below the contraceptive threshold of 1 million/ml.

However, it was not until 50 years later, in 1991, that the first study reporting the contraceptive effect of heat on men was published: andrologists Roger Mieusset and Jean-Claude Soufir were the first to get results with the artificial cryptorchidism method (testicles held inside the inguinal sack) with the use of suited devices.

=== Thermal insulation of the testis ===
A surgical intervention causes the testicles to be held in the inguinal sack.

=== Heating devices ===
As of 1990 various techniques had been considered, such as an insulating bag with heating elements in contact with the scrotum. Wearing a device that presses the man's testicles against his body on a daily basis can raise their temperature by 2 °C and thus slow down sperm production. To be effective, the device must be worn daily (approximately 15 hours per day) for at least 3 months, which is equivalent to the sperm's life cycle. This allows the contraceptive threshold of one million per millilitre of sperm to be temporarily reached (compared to an average of 15 to 60 million). Practitioners should do pre- and post-usage testing to check their sperm counts.

==== Heating underwear ====
The heating briefs are one of the available devices. This method was invented and is prescribed by Doctor Mieusset at the University Hospital of Toulouse. In 2019, a French news channel reported that "only about twenty men were wearing this contraceptive garment in France". It is not sold on the market and a poorly handcrafted design can cause discomfort or irritation. Other "do-it-yourself" models called "jock-strap" or "bra" also exist. In 2022, 68% of respondents had adopted the new method after less than two weeks, despite initial concerns. After they had completely switched (n = 59), they gave a significantly improved sexual satisfaction compared to the previous method of contraception

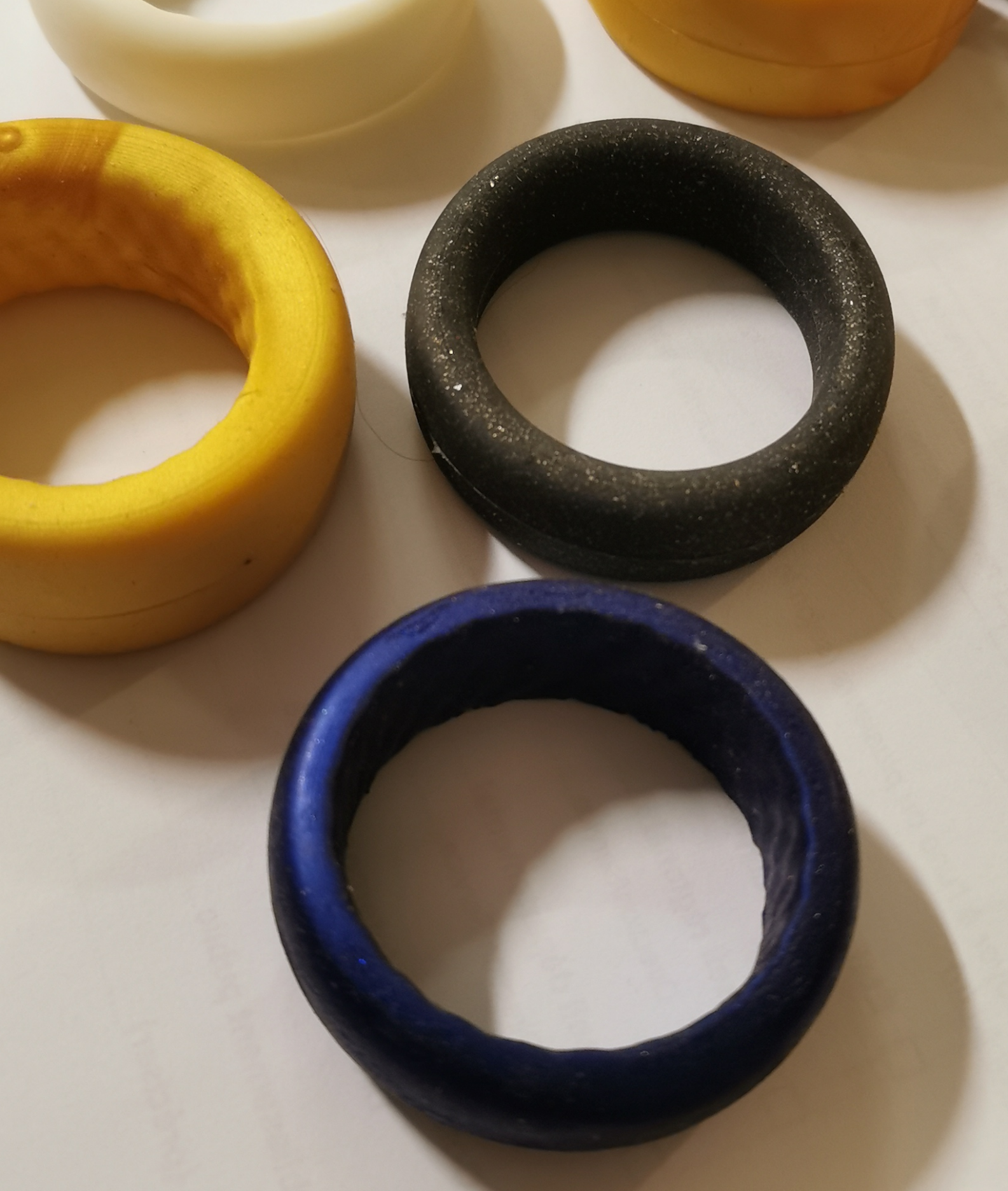
Silicone used to induce artificial cryptorchidism.

==== Silicone ring ====
Another available device is the silicone ring. Invented and patented by Maxime Labrit, a French nurse, it is available for purchase on the Internet for a few dozen euros.

=== Ultrasound ===
One method under investigation is ultrasound, which involves the application of high-frequency sound waves to animal tissue, which in turn absorb the sound waves' energy as heat. The possibility for ultrasound's use for contraception is based on the idea that briefly heating the testes can halt sperm production, leading to temporary infertility for about six months. Additionally, ultrasound could affect cells' absorption rates of ions, which itself could create an environment unfavorable to spermatogenesis. Its extremely localized effects on animal tissues make ultrasound an attractive candidate for research. So far studies have been performed on non-human animals, such as dogs, as well as on humans for temporary or permanent contraception which provides a method to "temporarily or permanently suppress spermatogenesis while causing the subject substantially no discomfort.".

"This apparatus provides for the controlled application of ultrasonic vibrations to the testes of human males in such a way to cause temporary or permanent sterility selectively as desired without affecting the subject's sex drive, his sex characteristics or general health."

== See also ==
- Birth control
- Comparison of birth control methods
- Human population planning
