= Triethyl phosphate =

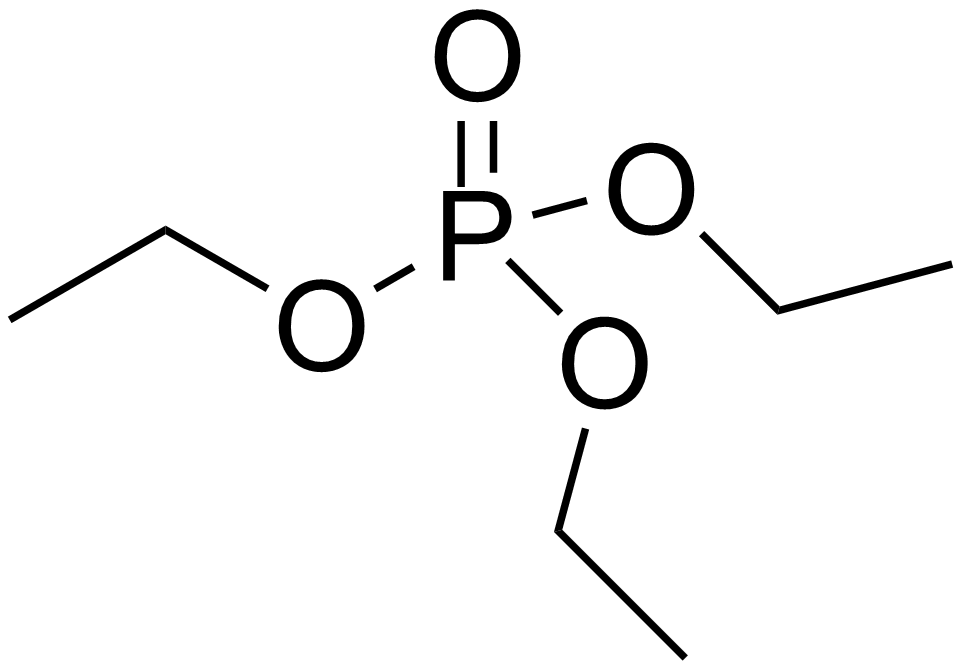

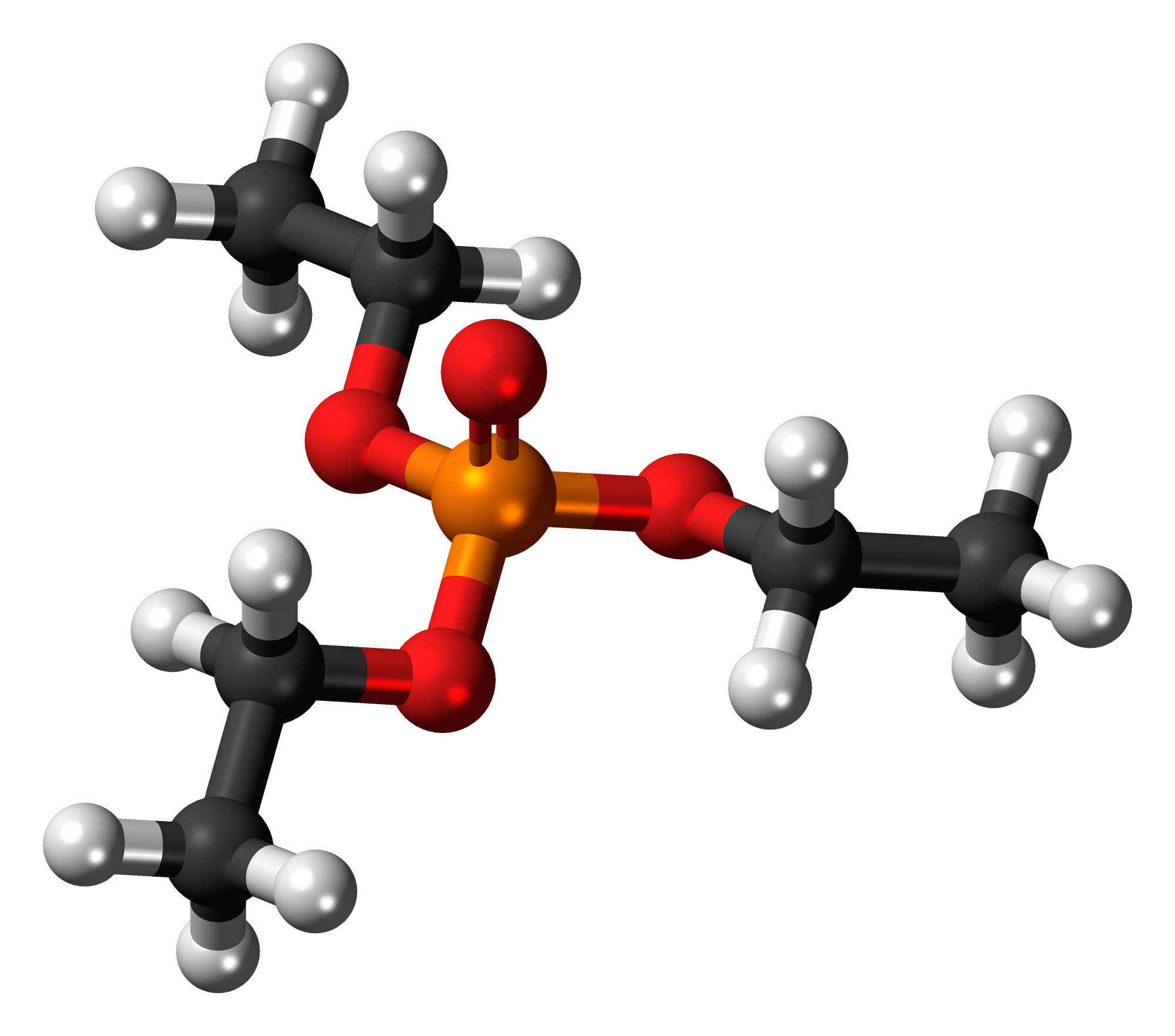

Names
- Preferred IUPAC name Triethyl phosphate
- Other names Phosphoric acid triethyl ester Phosphoric ester (archaic); Flame retardant TEP; Tris(ethyl) phosphate Triethoxyphosphine oxide Ethyl phosphate (neutral)

Identifiers
CAS Number	78-40-0
3D model (JSmol)	Interactive image
Abbreviations	TEP; Et_{3}PO_{4} (EtO)_{3}PO
ChEBI	CHEBI:45927
ChemSpider	6287
DrugBank	DB03347
ECHA InfoCard	100.001.013
PubChem CID	6535
UNII	QIH4K96K7J
CompTox Dashboard (EPA)	DTXSID801335682, DTXSID901024589 DTXSID8026228, DTXSID801335682, DTXSID901024589
- InChI: InChI=1S/C6H15O4P/c1-4-8-11(7,9-5-2)10-6-3/h4-6H2,1-3H3 Key: DQWPFSLDHJDLRL-UHFFFAOYSA-N; InChI=1/C6H15O4P/c1-4-8-11(7,9-5-2)10-6-3/h4-6H2,1-3H3 Key: DQWPFSLDHJDLRL-UHFFFAOYAA
- SMILES: O=P(OCC)(OCC)OCC

Properties
Chemical formula	(CH_{3}CH_{2})_{3}PO_{4}
Molar mass	182.156 g·mol^{−1}
Appearance	colorless liquid
Density	1.072 g/cm^{3}
Melting point	−56.5 °C (−69.7 °F; 216.7 K)
Boiling point	215 °C (419 °F; 488 K)
Solubility in water	Miscible
Magnetic susceptibility (χ)	−125.3·10^{−6} cm^{3}/mol

Hazards
NFPA 704 (fire diamond)	2 1 0
Flash point	107 °C (225 °F; 380 K)
- Safety data sheet (SDS)

Related compounds
Related compounds	Trimethyl phosphate
- Except where otherwise noted, data are given for materials in their standard state (at 25 °C [77 °F], 100 kPa). Infobox references

Triethyl phosphate is an organic chemical compound with the formula (CH_{3}CH_{2})_{3}PO_{4} or Et_{3}PO_{4}, where Et is ethyl. It is a colorless liquid. It is the triethyl ester of phosphoric acid and can be called "phosphoric acid, triethyl ester".

Its primary uses are as an industrial catalyst (in acetic anhydride synthesis), a polymer resin modifier, and a plasticizer (e.g. for unsaturated polyesters). In smaller scale it is used as a solvent for e.g. cellulose acetate, flame retardant, an intermediate for pesticides and other chemicals, stabilizer for peroxides, a strength agent for rubber and plastic including vinyl polymers and unsaturated polyesters, etc.

== History ==
It was studied for the first time by French chemist Jean Louis Lassaigne in the early 19th century.

== See also ==
- Franz Anton Voegeli
