= Trimethyl phosphate =

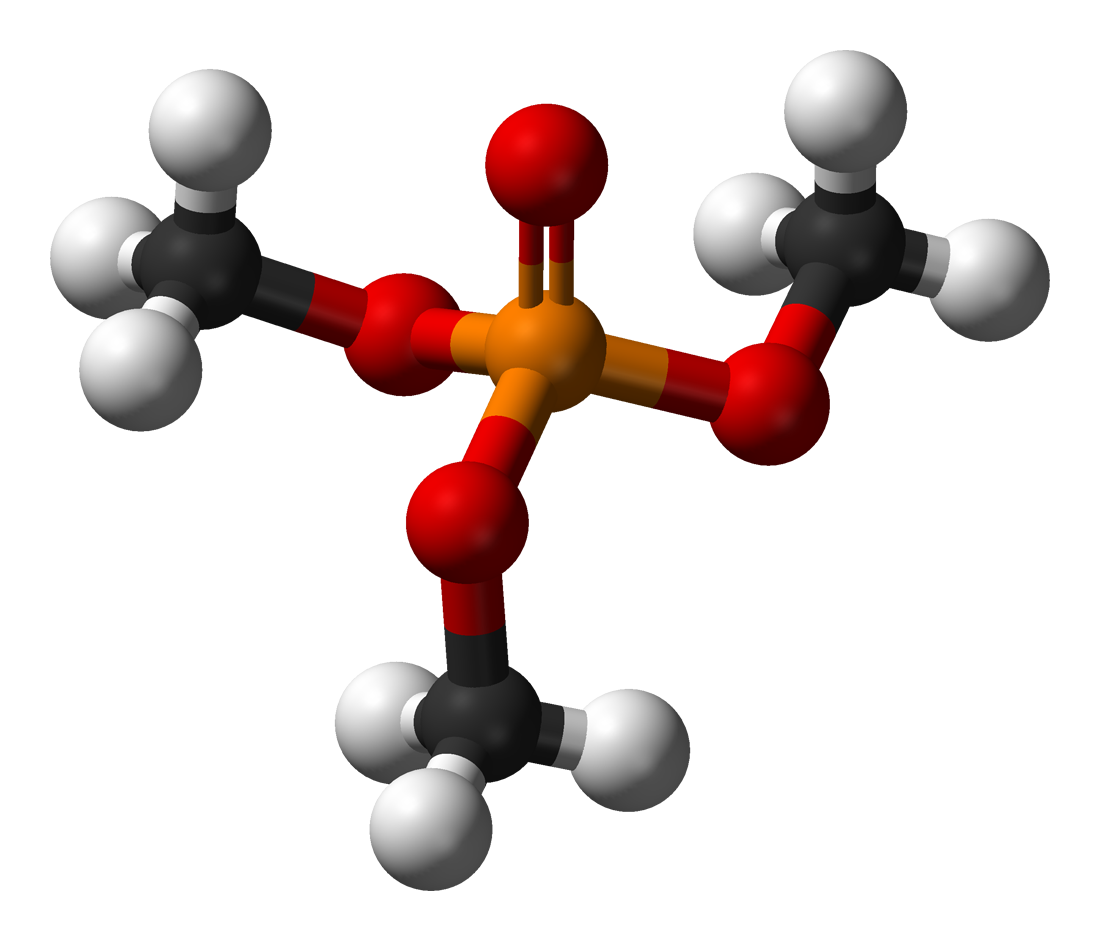
- Ball-and-stick model of trimethyl phosphate

Names
- Preferred IUPAC name Trimethyl phosphate
- Other names Phosphoric acid trimethyl ester Methyl phosphate, tribasic Trimethoxyphosphine oxide Trimethyl orthophosphate fraction

Identifiers
CAS Number	512-56-1
3D model (JSmol)	Interactive image
Abbreviations	TMP
Beilstein Reference	1071731
ChEBI	CHEBI:46324
ChemSpider	10101
ECHA InfoCard	100.007.405
Gmelin Reference	49926
PubChem CID	10541
RTECS number	TC8225000
UNII	Z1E45TMW1Z
CompTox Dashboard (EPA)	DTXSID1021403
- InChI: InChI=1S/C3H9O4P/c1-5-8(4,6-2)7-3/h1-3H3 Key: WVLBCYQITXONBZ-UHFFFAOYSA-N; InChI=1/C3H9O4P/c1-5-8(4,6-2)7-3/h1-3H3 Key: WVLBCYQITXONBZ-UHFFFAOYAV
- SMILES: O=P(OC)(OC)OC

Properties
Chemical formula	(CH_{3}O)_{3}PO
Molar mass	140.075 g·mol^{−1}
Appearance	Colorless liquid
Melting point	−46 °C (−51 °F; 227 K)
Boiling point	197 °C (387 °F; 470 K)
Solubility in water	good

Hazards
- GHS labelling
Pictograms	(GHS05: Corrosive) (GHS07: Exclamation mark) (GHS08: Health hazard)
Signal word	Danger
Hazard statements	H302, H315, H318, H319, H340, H350, H351, H361, H373
Precautionary statements	P201, P202, P260, P264, P270, P280, P281, P301+P312, P302+P352, P305+P351+P338, P308+P313, P310, P314, P321, P330, P332+P313, P337+P313, P362, P405, P501
NFPA 704 (fire diamond)	2 1 0

Related compounds
Related compounds	Triethyl phosphate
- Except where otherwise noted, data are given for materials in their standard state (at 25 °C [77 °F], 100 kPa). verify (what is ?) Infobox references

Trimethyl phosphate is the trimethyl ester of phosphoric acid. It is a colourless, nonvolatile liquid. It has the chemical formula (CH_{3})_{3}PO_{4} or (CH_{3}O)_{3}P=O. It has some specialized uses in the production of other compounds.

== Production ==
Trimethyl phosphate is prepared by treating phosphorus oxychloride with methanol in the presence of an amine base:

POCl_{3} + 3 CH_{3}OH + 3 R_{3}N → OP(OCH_{3})_{3} + 3 [R_{3}NH]^{+}Cl^{−}

It is a tetrahedral molecule that is a weakly polar solvent.

== Applications ==
Trimethyl phosphate is a mild methylating agent, useful for dimethylation of anilines and related heterocyclic compounds. The method is complementary to the traditional Eschweiler-Clarke reaction in cases where formaldehyde engages in side reactions.

Trimethyl phosphate is used as a solvent for aromatic halogenations and nitrations as required for the preparation of pesticides and pharmaceuticals.

=== Other applications ===
It is used as a color inhibitor for fibers (e.g. polyester) and other polymers. Trimethyl phosphate is used as a simulant for chemical weapon nerve agents.

Along with triethyl phosphate, it is used as an internal standard in ^{31}P NMR with a characteristic signal at 36.2 ppm.

== Safety considerations ==
With an LD50 of 2g/kg for rats, trimethylphosphate is expected to have low acute toxicity.
