= Gymnaconitum =

Scientific classification
- Kingdom: Plantae
- Clade: Tracheophytes
- Clade: Angiosperms
- Clade: Eudicots
- Order: Ranunculales
- Family: Ranunculaceae
- Subfamily: Ranunculoideae
- Tribe: Delphinieae
- Genus: Gymnaconitum (Stapf) Wei Wang & Z.D.Chen
- Species: G. gymnandrum

Binomial name
- Gymnaconitum gymnandrum (Maxim.) Wei Wang & Z.D.Chen

Synonyms
- Homotypic Synonyms: Aconitum gymnandrum Maxim.; Heterotypic Synonyms: Aconitum gymnandrum f. leucanthum W.T.Wang

Genus of plants

Gymnaconitum is a genus of flowering plants belonging to the family Ranunculaceae. The only species is Gymnaconitum gymnandrum. It was formerly known as Aconitum gymnandrum. Its native range is China.
