= National Party for Reform =

Political party in the Democratic Republic of the Congo

The National Party for Reform (French: Parti National pour la Réforme, PNR) is a national political movement registered with the Interior Ministry of the Democratic Republic of Congo, Decree No. 109/2010 of 15 June 2010.

PNR's headquarters is in Kinshasa.

The party's national president is Delphin Kyubwa, a resident of the U.S. state of California.

In the November 2011 parliamentary election, the PNR won one seat in the National Assembly.
