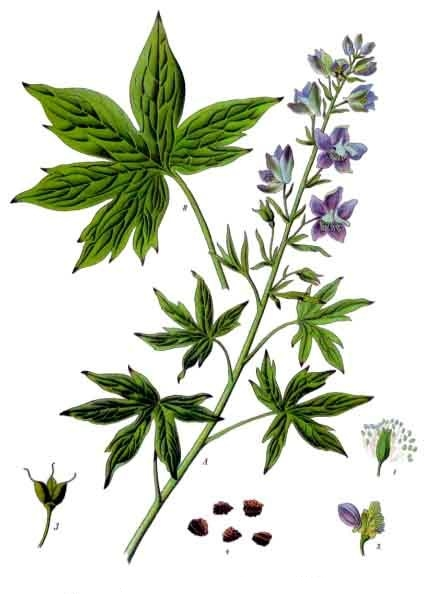
- Staphisagria macrosperma

Scientific classification
- Kingdom: Plantae
- Clade: Tracheophytes
- Clade: Angiosperms
- Clade: Eudicots
- Order: Ranunculales
- Family: Ranunculaceae
- Subfamily: Ranunculoideae
- Tribe: Delphinieae
- Genus: Staphisagria; Hill

Type species
- Delphinium staphisagria L.

= Staphisagria =

Genus of plants

Staphisagria is a genus in the family Ranunculaceae native to the Mediterranean. It used to be a subgenus or section in the genus Delphinium, but molecular evidence suggests it should be a genus.

== Species list ==
There are three species in Staphisagria:

- Staphisagria macrosperma Spach = Delphinium staphisagria L.
- Staphisagria requienii (DC.) Spach = Delphinium requienii DC.
- Staphisagria picta (Willd.) Jabbour = Delphinium pictum Willd.

Or two, as some botanists think S. requienii and S. picta should be united as one species, with S. picta treated as S. requienii subsp. picta.

== See also ==
- Aconitum
- Delphinium
