= Marthe Voegeli =

Swiss physician

Marthe Voegeli MD
- Education: M.D., University of Paris and University of Berlin, Masters Degree from Columbia University
- Years active: 1921–1950
- Known for: Heat-based male contraceptive
- Medical career
- Profession: Physician and medical researcher

Marthe Voegeli was a Swiss physician and pioneer in the field of male contraceptive research.

Between 1930 and 1950, Voegeli practiced medicine in India at her own private hospital. During this time, with the assistance of 9 volunteers, she experimented with a process of heat-based contraception.

The process was simple and effective. A man would bathe his testes in a hot bath for 45 minutes a day for 3 weeks. On the completion of the 3 weeks, a period of infertility was recorded by the volunteers.

Different bath temperatures produced varying lengths of infertility. A bath of 116 °F (46.7 °C) would provide contraceptive protection for 6 months. A bath of 110° (43.3 °C) would provide contraception for at least 4 months.

After fertility returned in the males, the conception of healthy offspring with normal childhood development was recorded.

Voegeli retired from medicine in 1950 and spent the next 20 years involved in efforts to publicise the contraceptive method, which were largely ignored.
