= Delphin Enjolras =

French painter

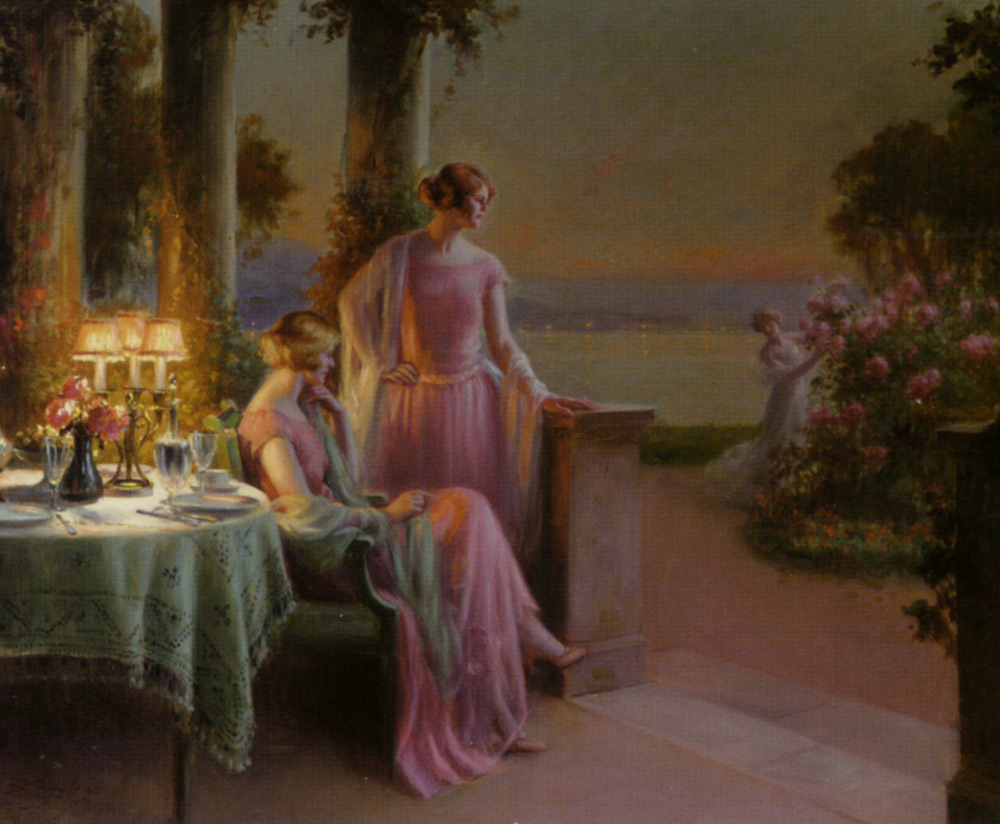
Elegant Ladies Taking Tea

Delphin Enjolras (1857 Coucouron –1945 Toulouse) was a French academic painter. Enjolras painted portraits, nudes, interiors, and used mostly watercolours, oil, and pastels. He is best known for his intimate portraits of young women performing mundane activities such as reading or sewing, often illuminated by lamplight. Perhaps his most famous work is the "Young Woman Reading by a Window."

== Biography ==
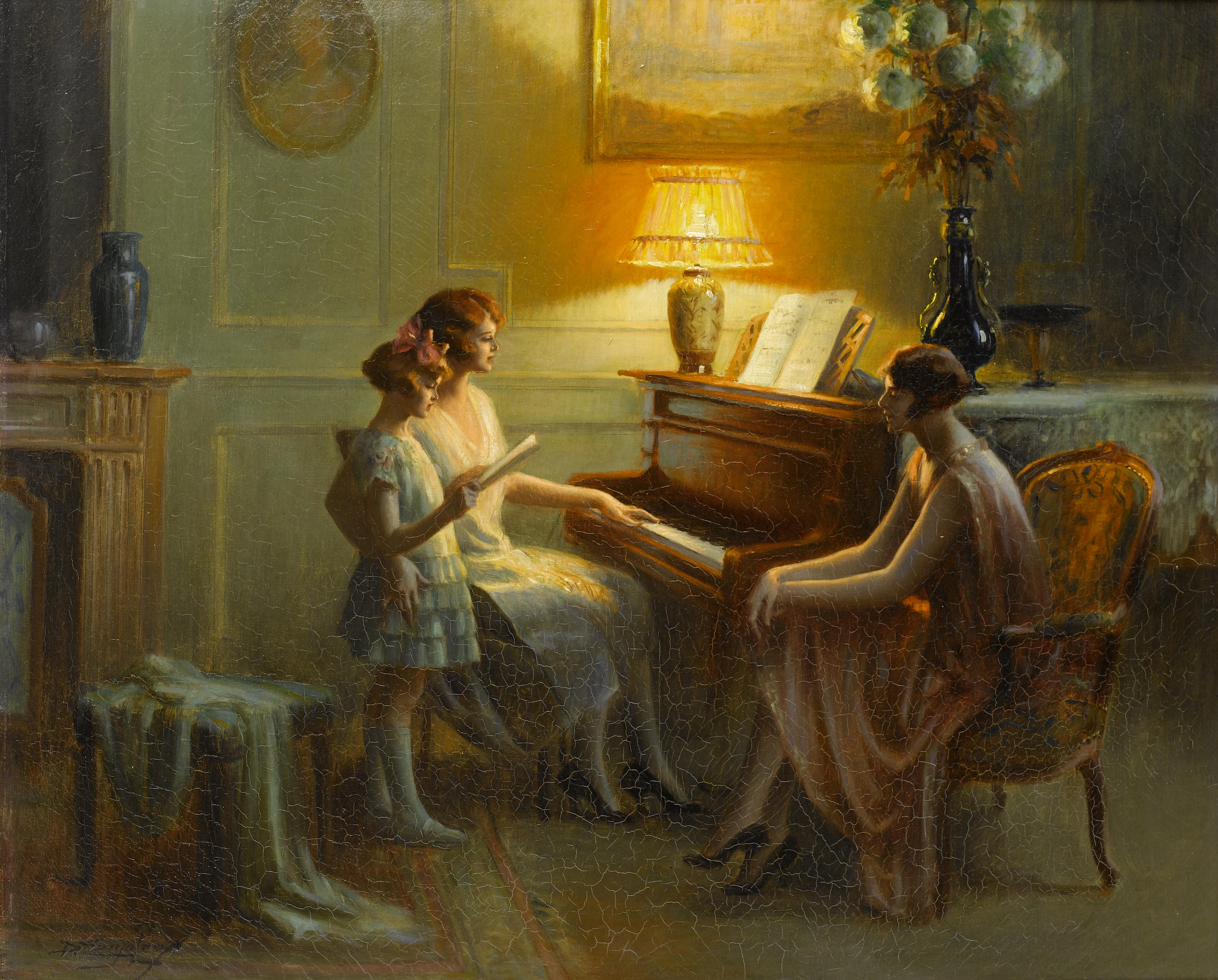
By the Piano

He was born in Coucouron, Ardèche, son of Casimir Enjolras and Delphine Laurens. Enjolras studied under watercolorist Gaston Gérard at the "Ecole de Dessin de la Ville de Paris", as well as Jean-Léon Gérôme at the Beaux-Arts, and Pascal Dagnan-Bouveret. Enjolras painted mainly landscapes in his early career; later it became evident that his love was for painting women. He changed genres, focusing mainly on the portraiture of elegant young women by either lamplight or back lighting. He would become an excellent painter of nudes, and many of his later works, such as "La Sieste", are of an erotic and sensual nature.

From 1890 and onwards, Enjolras exhibited his works at the Paris Salon, joining the Société des Artistes Français in 1901. Also, the Musée du Puy and Musée d'Avignon both have collections of his works.

== Gallery ==
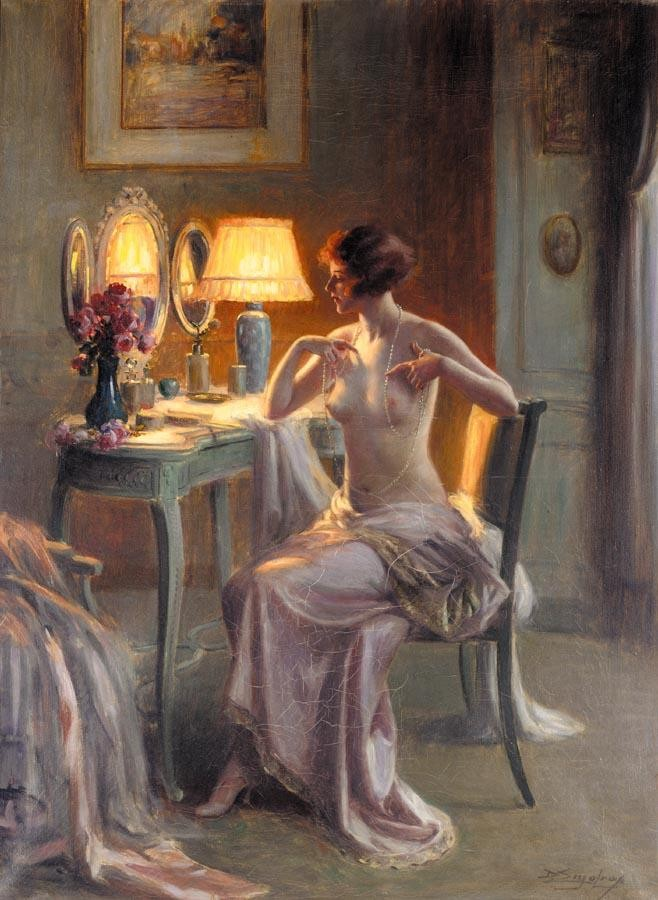
The Pearl Necklace

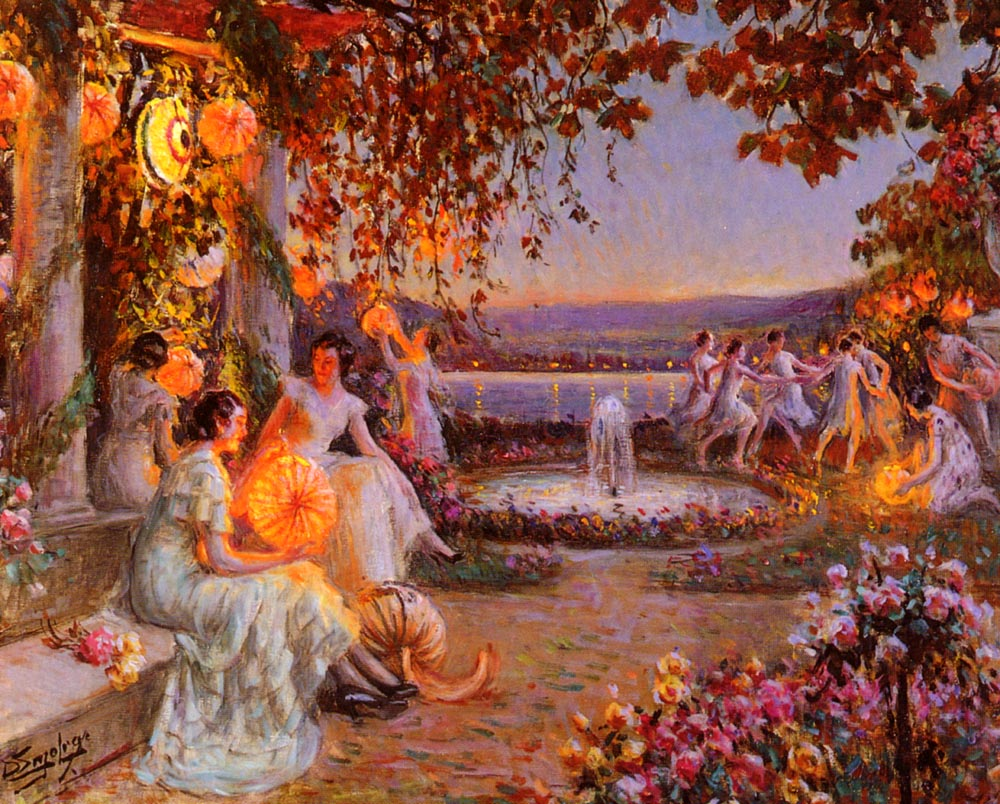
The Lampions

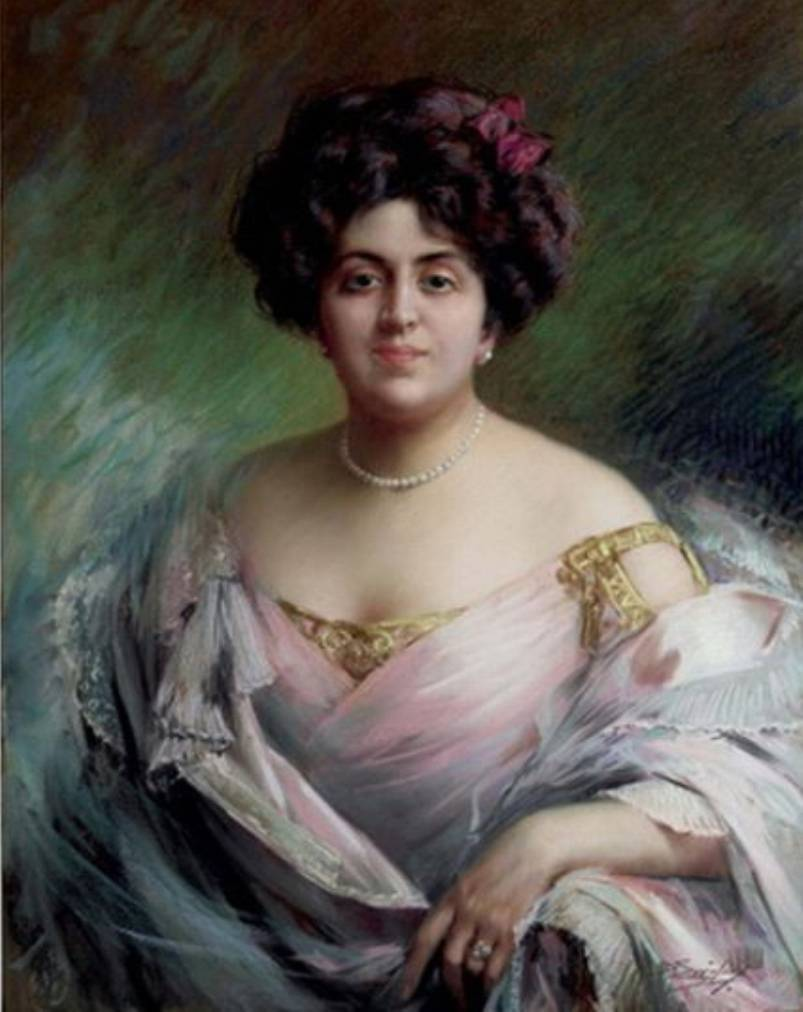
Elegant Lady

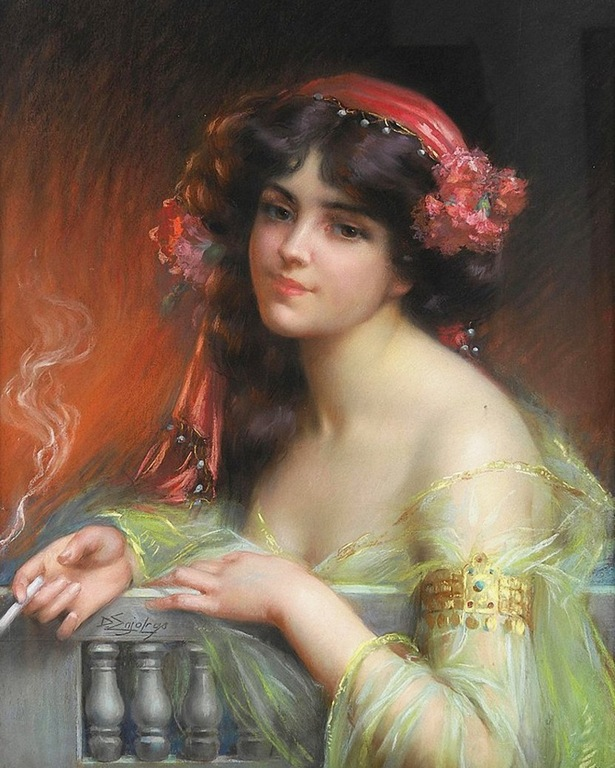
A girl and a cigarette
