= Delphin =

1944 class of German midget submarines

German Delphin midget submarine, c. 1944/45

Delphin (dolphin) was a midget submarine created during World War II. Designed in 1944, only three prototypes were created by Nazi Germany's Kriegsmarine by the end of the war, all of which were destroyed. The Delphin was built for underwater speed attacks, as German engineers under the leadership of Ulrich Gabler discovered that past midget submarines were too slow to match the speeds of large ships in the English Channel.

Delphin weighed 2.5 tonnes (2.5 long tons) and was easily recognizable due to its tear-drop shape, which allowed the vessel to travel through the water at higher speeds. During trials, the submarine reached a speed of seventeen knots while submerged. On 19 January 1945, the first prototype was destroyed after a collision with a boat and resulted in further testing being abandoned. Two other prototypes under construction in Berlin were moved to Pötenitz near Trave, where they were blown up as Allied forces approached.

== Bibliography ==
- Rössler, Eberhard (2001). The U-Boat: The Evolution and Technical History of German Submarines. London: Cassell. ISBN 0-304-36120-8.
- Sieche, Erwin F. "German Human Torpedoes and Midget Submarines". Information on the Delphin class. Archived from the original on July 18, 2006.
