= Delphine Fitz Darby =

American art historian

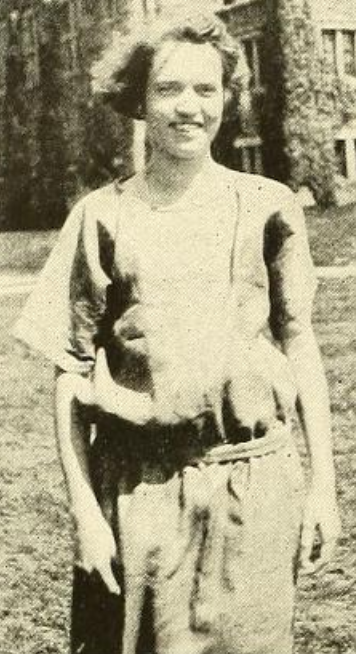
- Born: January 10, 1902; Bala Cynwyd, Pennsylvania, U.S.
- Died: November 14, 1995 (aged 93); Highlands County, Florida, U.S.
- Occupations: Art historian, professor, writer

Delphine Fitz Darby (January 10, 1902 – November 14, 1995) was an American art historian and writer. She was a professor at Smith College and at the University of Maryland, College Park. Her research concerned Spanish Baroque painter Francesc Ribalta and his student, Jusepe de Ribera.

== Early life and education ==
Fitz was born in Bala Cynwyd, Pennsylvania, the daughter of Charles W. Fitz and Elsie Rimmer Long Fitz. She graduated from Bryn Mawr College in 1923, earned a master's degree there in 1925, and completed doctoral studies there in 1929. She was the only doctoral student of medievalist Georgiana Goddard King, and won a Carnegie Fellowship to do research in Spain.

== Career ==
Darby was an assistant professor of art at Smith College from 1930 to 1931. She also taught at the University of Maryland, College Park. Her scholarship concerned Spanish painter Francesc Ribalta, and his student, Jusepe de Ribera. During World War II, she defended the exhibition of Italian art at the National Gallery.

== Publications ==
- Francisco Ribalta and His School (1938)
- "In the Train of a Vagrant Silenus" (1943)
- "The Wise Man with a Looking Glass" (1948)
- "Ribera and the Blind Men" (1957)
- "The Ecstasy of St. Francis, a newly acquired painting by Francisco Ribalta" (1957)
- "Ribera and the Wise Men" (1962)
- Juan Sariñena y sus colegas (1967)
- The Gentle Ribera: Painter of the Madonna and the Holy Family (1978)

== Personal life and legacy ==
Fitz married Navy commander and college professor George O'Dell Switzer Darby in 1928. Her husband died in 1981, and she died in 1995, at the age of 93, in Highlands County, Florida. There is an endowed fund at Bryn Mawr College, named for Darby and designated for the purchase of art history materials. Her photo albums of Pennsylvania landscapes are in the Historical Society of Pennsylvania.
