= Delphine Lannuzel =

Sea ice biogeochemist

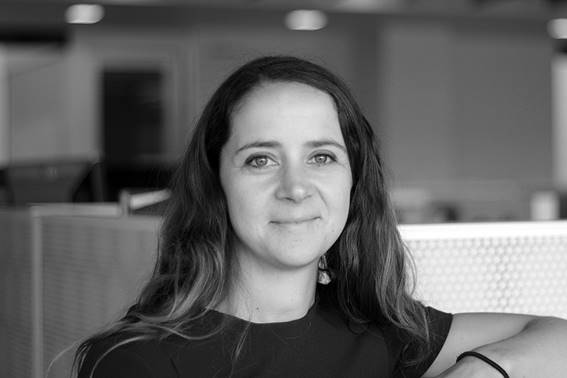
- Education: Université libre de Bruxelles
- Scientific career
- Fields: Biogeochemistry
- Workplaces: Institute for Marine and Antarctic Studies

Delphine Lannuzel is an Australian sea ice biogeochemist. She is a professor at the Institute for Marine and Antarctic Studies (IMAS), University of Tasmania.

== Early life and education ==
Lannuzel completed her undergraduate degree at the Institut Universitaire Européen de la Mer, Brest, France in 2001. In 2006, Lannuzel was awarded her PhD in Biogeochemistry of iron in the Antarctic sea ice environment from the Université libre de Bruxelles, Belgium.

== Career and impact ==
Lannuzel was previously an Australian Research Council (ARC) Discovery Early Career Researcher at IMAS. Lannuzel's research is in the study of trace metals in the sea ice environment

The iron and other trace element data generated from her research represented the first for the Antarctic pack ice zone. Her pioneering work highlighted the accumulation of trace element iron in sea ice and therefore the paramount importance of Antarctic sea ice to iron biogeochemical cycling in polar ecosystems.

== Awards and honors ==
In 2007, Lannuzel was awarded a Scientific Committee on Antarctic Research (SCAR) Fellowship. In 2011, she was awarded both the University of Tasmania Vice Chancellor Award for Research Excellence and the Japan Society for the Promotion of Science Award.
