= Delphin Kyubwa =

Delphin Bugigi Kyubwa is a political movement leader in the Democratic Republic of Congo, the chairman of Party for National Reform (PNR).
