= Miriam Delphin-Rittmon =

American clinical psychologist

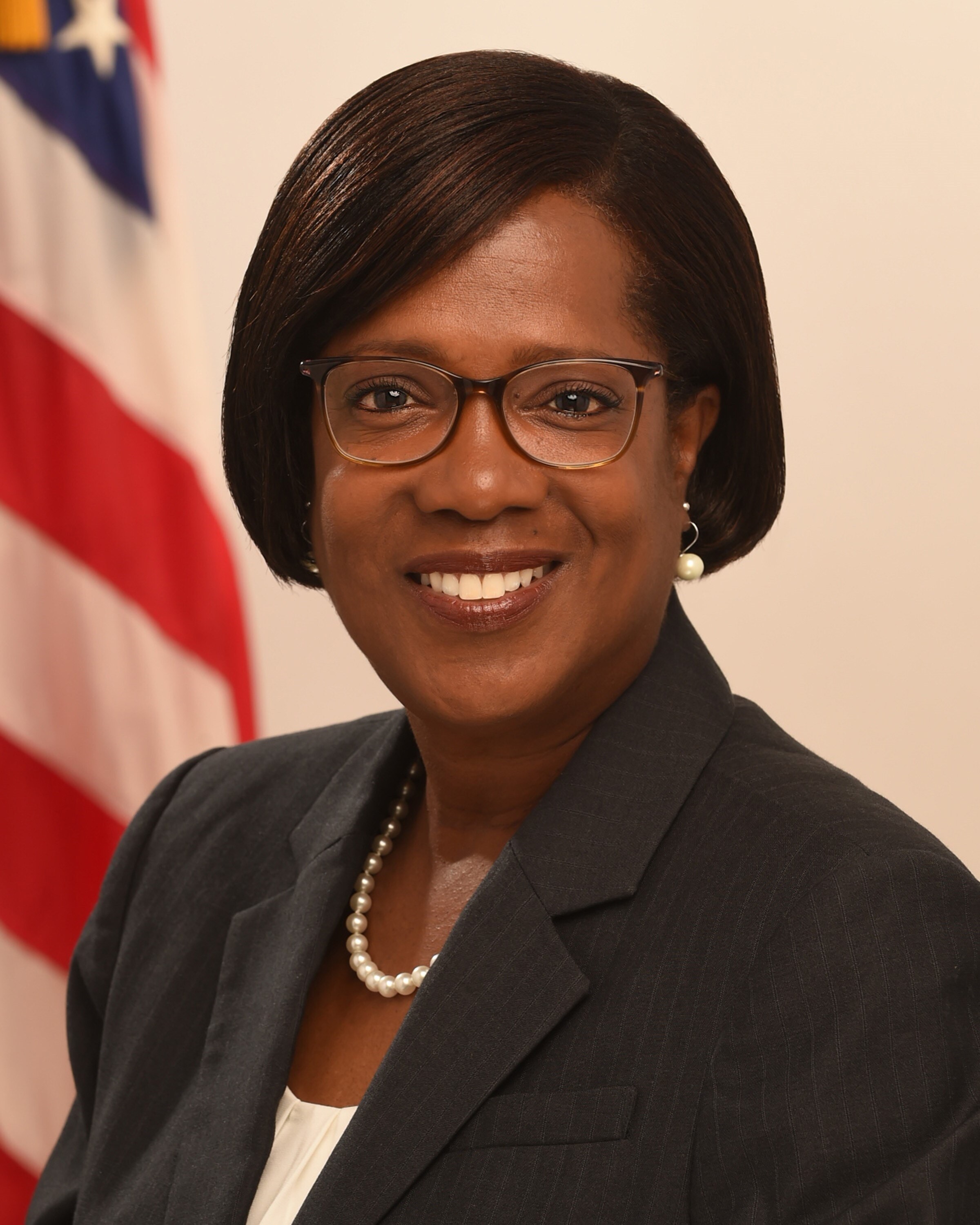

Assistant Secretary of Health and Human Services (Mental Health and Substance Use)
- In office July 14, 2021 – January 20, 2025
- President: Joe Biden
- Preceded by: Tom Coderre
- Succeeded by: TBD

Commissioner of the Connecticut Department of Mental Health and Addiction Services
- In office March 2015 – June 2021
- Governor: Dannel Malloy; Ned Lamont
- Preceded by: Patricia Rehmer
- Succeeded by: Nancy Navarretta

Personal details
- Education: Hofstra University (BA); Purdue University (MS, PhD)

Miriam Delphin-Rittmon is an American psychologist from Connecticut who served as the Assistant Secretary of Health and Human Services for Mental Health and Substance Use from 2021 to 2025.

== Education ==
Delphin-Rittmon received her Bachelor of Arts in social science from Hofstra University in 1989, her Master of Science in 1992, and a Doctor of Philosophy in clinical psychology from Purdue University in 2001. She completed a postdoctoral fellowship in clinical community psychology at Yale University in 2002.

== Career ==
Delphin-Rittmon has previously served as deputy commissioner, senior policy advisor and director of the Department of Mental Health and Addiction Services of Multicultural Health Equity. She was appointed commissioner of the department in March 2015. She is an associate adjunct professor with the Yale University Department of Psychiatry and from 2003 to 2015, she served as director of Cultural Competence and Health Disparities Research and Consultation with the Program for Recovery and Community Health. In May 2014, she completed a two-year White House appointment working as a senior advisor to the Administrator of the Substance Abuse and Mental Health Services Administration with the United States Department of Health and Human Services. She is a member of the Connecticut Sentencing Commission.

=== Assistant Secretary for Mental Health and Substance Use ===
On April 23, 2021, President Joe Biden announced his intent to nominate Delphin-Rittmon to be an Assistant Secretary for Mental Health and Substance Use. She is the second commissioner from Connecticut to be chosen by the Biden administration, after Miguel Cardona. She was confirmed by the Senate on June 24, 2021, by Unanimous Consent.

== Awards and recognition ==
Delphin-Rittmon received the 2019 State Service Award from the National Association of State Drug and Alcohol Directors and the 2016 Mental Health Award for Excellence from the United Nations Committee on Mental Health.
