= Joachim Menant =

French magistrate and orientalist (1820–1899)

Joachim Menant (16 April 1820 – 30 August 1899) was a French magistrate and orientalist.

He was born in Cherbourg. He studied law and became vice-president of the tribunal civil of Rouen in 1878, and a member of the court of appeal three years later. But he became best known for his studies on cuneiform inscriptions.

He also collaborated with Julius Oppert. He was admitted to the Academy of Inscriptions in 1887, and died in Paris two years later.

His daughter Delphine (b. 1850) received a prize from the Académie française for her Les Parsis, histoire des communautés zoroastriennes de l'Inde (1898), and was sent in 1900–1901 to British India on a scientific mission, of which she published a report in 1903.

== Selected bibliography ==
- La Bibliothèque du palais de Ninive, Paris, E. Leroux, 1880. Texte en ligne
- Les Langues perdues de la Perse et de l'Assyrie, Paris, E. Leroux, 1886. Texte en ligne
- Annales des rois d'Assyrie, traduites et mises en ordre sur le texte assyrien, Paris, Maisonneuve, 1874
- Babylone et la Chaldée, Paris, Maisonneuve, 1875
- Catalogue des cylindres orientaux du Cabinet royal des médailles de La Haye, La Haye : Imprimerie de l'État, 1878
- Collection épigraphique de M. Lottin de Laval. Inscriptions en caractères cunéiformes des briques de Babylone. Essai de lecture et d'interprétation, Caen, Impr. Hardel, 1859
- Découvertes assyriennes; la bibliothèque du palais de Ninive. Paris, E. Leroux, 1880
- Éléments d'épigraphie assyrienne; les écritures cunéiformes, exposé des travaux qui ont préparé la lecture et l'interprétation des inscriptions de la Perse et de l'Assyrie, Paris, B. Duprat, 1864
- Éléments d'épigraphie assyrienne; manuel de la langue assyrienne: I. Le syllabaire. II. La grammaire. III. Choix de lectures, Paris, Imprimerie nationale, 1880
- Éléments d'épigraphie assyrienne. Le syllabaire assyrien, exposé des éléments du système phonétique de l'écriture anarienne, Paris, Imprimerie impériale, 1869–1873
- Éléments du syllabaire hétéen, Paris, Imprimerie nationale : C. Klincksieck, 1892
- Empreintes de cylindres assyro-chaldéens relevées sur les contrats d'intérêt privé du Musée Britannique, Paris, Imprimerie nationale, 1880
- Exposé des éléments de la grammaire assyrienne, Paris, Imprimerie impériale, 1868
- Grande inscription du palais de Khorsabad. Paris, Imprimerie Impériale, 1863
- Inscriptions assyriennes des briques de Babylone; essai de lecture et d'interprétation, Paris, B. Duprat, 1859
- Inscriptions de Hammourabi, roi de Babylone (XVI^{e} siècle avant J.-C.), Paris, B. Duprat, 1863
- Inscriptions des revers de plaques du palais de Khorsabad, Paris, Imprimerie impériale, 1865
- Kar-Kemish : sa position d'après les découvertes modernes, Paris, Imprimerie nationale, 1891
- La Bible et les cylindres chaldéens, Paris, Imprimerie nationale, 1880, 1879
- La Stèle de Chalouf; essai de restitution du texte perse, Paris, F. Vieweg, 1887
- Leçons d'épigraphie assyrienne professées aux cours libres de la Sorbonne pendant l'année 1869, Paris, Maisonneuve, 1873
- Les Achéménides et les inscriptions de la Perse, Paris, A. Lévy, 1872
- Les Cylindres orientaux du Cabinet royal des médailles à La Haye, Paris, Imprimerie nationale, 1879
- Les Écritures cunéiformes exposé des travaux qui on préparé la lecture et l'interprétation des inscriptions de la Perse et de l'Assyrie, Paris, Duprat, 1860
- Les Fausses Antiquités de l'Assyrie et de la Chaldée, Paris, Ernest Leroux, 1888
- Les Langues perdues de la Perse & de l'Assyrie, Paris, Ernest Leroux, 1885–1886
- Les Noms propres assyriens. recherches sur la formation des expressions idéographiques. Paris, Benjamin Duprat, 1861
- Les Pierres gravées de la Haute-Asie. Recherches sur la glyptique orientale, Paris, Maisonneuve, 1886
- Les Yédidiz; épisodes de l'histoire des adorateurs du diable, Paris, E. Leroux, 1892
- Manuel de la langue assyrienne. Paris, Imprimerie nationale, 1880
- Ninive et Babylone, Paris, Hachette, coll. La Bibliothèque des merveilles, 1888
- Notice sur les inscriptions en caractères cunéiformes de la collection épigraphique de M. Lottin de Laval, Caen, A. Hardel, 1858
- Notice sur quelques empreintes de cylindres du dernier empire de Chaldée, Paris, Imprimerie nationale, 1879
- Observations sur les polyphones assyriens, Lisieux, A. Durand, 1859
- Observations sur trois cylindres orientaux, Paris, Maisonneuve, 1880
- Rapport sur les inscriptions assyriennes du British Museum, Paris, 1862–1863
- Remarques sur les portraits des rois assyrochaldéens, Paris, Imprimerie nationale, 1882
- Zoroaster; essai sur la philosophie religieuse de la Perse, Paris, Derache, 1857
