= SIGMA Clermont =

Engineering school in France

Coordinates: 45.7577°N 3.1128°E

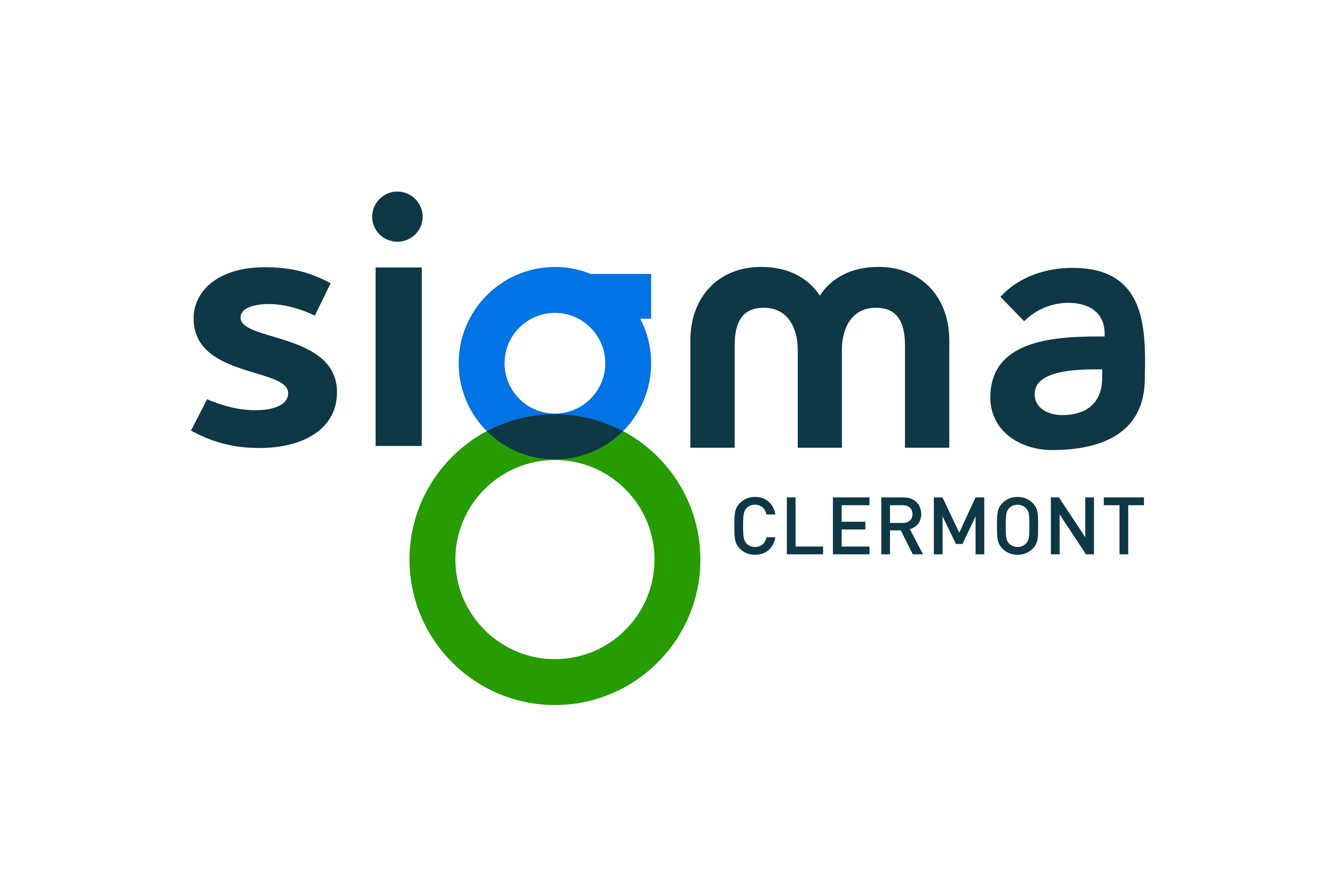
- Former names: ENSCCF & IFMA
- Type: Public Graduate Engineering School
- Established: 01.01.2016
- President: Nicolas Gayton
- Students: 950
- Location: Aubière, France
- Mascot: Grizzly
- Website: www.sigma-clermont.fr

SIGMA Clermont is a French graduate engineering school and is a public institution under the authority of the French Ministry of Higher Education, Research and Innovation. It is located in Aubière, Clermont-Ferrand metropolitan area, France.

It was created on 01.01.2016 following the merger of the French Institute for Advanced Mechanics (IFMA) and the National Graduate School of Chemistry (ENSCCF). SIGMA Clermont is a member of the French Conference of graduate engineering schools, and the Gay-Lussac Federation, which comprises 20 French chemistry schools. It is also an associated member of the Mines-Télécom network.

SIGMA Clermont offers two degrees in engineering, recognized by the national engineering commission: engineer in chemistry and engineer in advanced mechanics. These degrees are equivalent to a Master of Science.

Furthermore, SIGMA Clermont, situated in the Les Cézeaux science campus, is a member of Clermont University and Associates, the local higher education association.

== Study offer ==
SIGMA Clermont offers different specializations in its two main fields of studies, Chemistry and Mechanical Engineering:

- Chemistry and Chemical Engineering department
  - Fine and Industrial Organic Chemistry (with further focus on therapeutical chemistry or natural substances and their applications)
  - High Performance Materials
  - Chemical Engineering
- Mechanical Engineering Department
  - Machines, Mechanics and Systems
  - Materials and Structures
  - Industrial Systems and Logistics

Three additional study tracks allow all students further specializations:

- International
- Aeronautics
- Entrepreneurship

Around a quarter of the curriculum is dedicated to human and social skills, economics and languages (French as Foreign Language, English, German, Spanish, Portuguese, Italian and Chinese).

== Research ==
SIGMA Clermont faculty members conduct their research activities within the framework of three high-level laboratories (Institut Pascal, LIMOS and ICCF), in collaboration with the CNRS and Clermont-Auvergne University, and cover a broad range of chemical and mechanical themes. Main axes of research are:

- Antalgic molecules
- Mechanics of materials and structures
- Photochemistry
- Image, perception systems, robotics
- (Bio)organic Chemistry
- Industrial Systems
- Process engineering, energy, bio systems
- Biophysical chemistry for the atmosphere
- Photonics, wave technology, nanomaterials
- Fluorescent materials
- Nanocomposites
