= Delphine Menant =

French ethnologist

Delphine Menant (1850‍–‍1932) was a French ethnologist and Orientalist.

== Life ==
Delphine Menant was born in Cherbourg in 1850. She was the daughter of the famous Assyriologist Joachim Menant and a pupil of James Darmesteter.

In 1900, she was sent as an attaché at the Guimet Museum to India to study Parsi people. She left with both her mother and a servant and arrived in Bombay in October 1900. She then studied the Parsis, their familial and political life, their education, hospitals, religion, and funerary rites. Then on 18 December, she travelled by train to visit Gujarat and study the Parsi communities there. She stayed in Umargam and Nargol as well as Sanjan and Navsari.

At the beginning of January 1901, she visited Bharuch before leaving for Baroda, where she stayed with the Maharaja of Baroda. Injured in a car accident, she spent three weeks recovering in hospital in Surat. In Surat she also met the family that housed Anquetil-Duperron (from 1758 to 1761), the first European translator of the sacred book of Parsis, the Zend-Avesta.

Menant died in Paris in 1932.

== Publications ==
- Les Parsis, histoire des communautés zoroastriennes de l'Inde, Ernest Leroux, 1898 available at Gallica
- Rapport sur une mission scientifique dans l'Inde britannique, 1902
- Note de Mademoiselle Delphine Menant sur les différentes cérémonies du culte mazdéen, présentée par Georges Perrot, Comptes rendus des séances de l'Académie des Inscriptions et Belles-Lettres, No. 4, vol. 46, 1902, p. 414
- Sacerdoce zoroastrien à Nausari, 1912

== Bibliography ==
- Numa Broc, Dictionnaire des explorateurs français du XIX^{e} siècle, T.2, Asie, CTHS, 1992, p. 325
