= Delphinine =

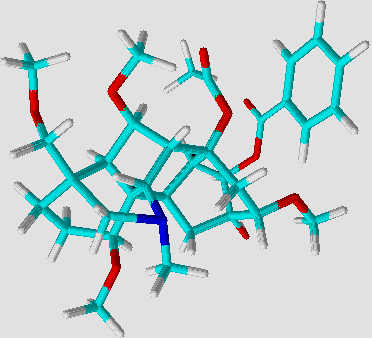

Names
- Other names 8-(Acetyloxy)-13-hydroxy-1,6,16-trimethoxy-4-(methoxymethyl)-20-methylaconitan-14-yl benzoate

Identifiers
CAS Number	561-07-9
3D model (JSmol)	Interactive image; Interactive image
ChemSpider	390329
ECHA InfoCard	100.008.377
PubChem CID	441726
UNII	IN41I78D7R
CompTox Dashboard (EPA)	DTXSID50971478
- InChI: InChI=1S/C33H45NO9/c1-18(35)43-32-15-22(40-5)31(37)14-20(23(32)28(31)42-29(36)19-10-8-7-9-11-19)33-21(39-4)12-13-30(17-38-3)16-34(2)27(33)24(32)25(41-6)26(30)33/h7-11,20-28,37H,12-17H2,1-6H3/t20-,21+,22+,23-,24+,25+,26-,27?,28-,30+,31+,32-,33+/m1/s1 Key: REVYTWNGZDPRKE-UWZYQZSNSA-N; InChI=1/C33H45NO9/c1-18(35)43-32-15-22(40-5)31(37)14-20(23(32)28(31)42-29(36)19-10-8-7-9-11-19)33-21(39-4)12-13-30(17-38-3)16-34(2)27(33)24(32)25(41-6)26(30)33/h7-11,20-28,37H,12-17H2,1-6H3/t20-,21+,22+,23-,24+,25+,26-,27?,28-,30+,31+,32-,33+/m1/s1 Key: REVYTWNGZDPRKE-UWZYQZSNBH
- SMILES: CC(=O)O[C@]12C[C@@H]([C@]3(C[C@H]([C@@H]1[C@H]3OC(=O)C4=CC=CC=C4)[C@]56[C@H](CC[C@@]7([C@H]5[C@H]([C@H]2C6N(C7)C)OC)COC)OC)O)OC; O=C(O[C@H]5[C@]3(O)C[C@H]4[C@@]16C2N(C)C[C@]([C@H]1[C@@H](OC)[C@@H]2[C@@](OC(=O)C)(C[C@@H]3OC)[C@H]45)(COC)CC[C@@H]6OC)c7ccccc7

Properties
Chemical formula	C_{33}H_{45}NO_{9}
Molar mass	599.712
Appearance	colorless solid
Melting point	197 to 199 °C (387 to 390 °F; 470 to 472 K)

Hazards
- Occupational safety and health (OHS/OSH)
Main hazards	Toxic
- Except where otherwise noted, data are given for materials in their standard state (at 25 °C [77 °F], 100 kPa). verify (what is ?) Infobox references

Delphinine is a toxic diterpenoid alkaloid found in plants from the Delphinium (larkspur) and Atragene (a clematis) genera, both in the family Ranunculaceae. Delphinine is the principal alkaloid found in Delphinium staphisagria seeds – at one time, under the name stavesacre, a very well known herbal treatment for body lice. It is related in structure and has similar effects to aconitine, acting as an allosteric modulator of voltage gated sodium channels, and producing low blood pressure, slowed heart rate and abnormal heart rhythms. These effects make it highly poisonous (LD_{50} 1.5–3.0 mg/kg in rabbit and dog; frogs are ~10x more susceptible). While it has been used in some alternative medicines (e.g. in herbal medicine), most of the medical community does not recommend using it due to its extreme toxicity.

== Isolation ==
One of the earliest reports of the isolation of delphinine, from D. staphisagria, was that of the French chemists Lassaigne and Feneulle, in 1819. A less antique and more accessible report is that of the USDA chemist L. N. Markwood, who also briefly reviewed the earlier isolation work. Notably, these early isolations were carried out without the aid of chromatography, since delphinine crystallizes readily from a petroleum ether extract after the typical acid-base cycling used in traditional plant alkaloid-extraction methods.

== Chemistry ==
Despite the relative ease of isolation and early discovery of delphinine, its molecular structure was not established in its currently accepted form until the early 1970s. At that time, Wiesner's research group corrected the stereochemistry of the methoxy group at C-1 from the β- to the α- configuration. Thus, any drawing of the delphinine molecule appearing before 1971–1972 is likely to show the incorrect stereochemistry at C-1.

== Pharmacology ==
As a result of its early discovery and isolation in crystalline form (then considered a criterion of purity), the pharmacological properties of delphinine were extensively investigated in the 19th century, despite the fact that its molecular structure was unknown. It is likely that some of these investigations were carried out with impure drug and should be interpreted with caution. References to and commentary on these early studies may be found in the review by Benn and Jacyno. More recent studies focused on the cardiovascular toxicity of delphinine.

In general, the pharmacology of delphinine seems to resemble that of aconitine, although the acute toxicity of delphinine appears to be lower than that of aconitine in test animals.
