= Franz Anton Voegeli =

Swiss chemist (1825–1874)

- Born: 1825
- Died: 1874 (aged 48–49)
- Known for: triethyl phosphate
- Scientific career
- Fields: Chemistry

Franz Anton Voegeli (1825–1874) was a Swiss chemist who was the first to synthesize triethyl phosphate (TEP) while he was working in Gustav Magnus's laboratory in Berlin.
