= Delphine Diallo =

French-Senegalese photographer (born 1977)

Delphine Diaw Diallo
- Born: 1977 (age 48–49); France
- Occupation: Photographer

Delphine Diallo, or Delphine Diaw Diallo (born 1977) is a French-born photographer of Senegalese descent. She has previously lived in Paris and Saint-Louis, Senegal, but is now in Brooklyn, New York.

== Biography ==
Delphine Diallo was born in 1977, in France. Diallo graduated from the Académie Charpentier School of Visual Art in Paris in 1999, before working in the music industry for seven years as a special-effects motion artist, video editor and graphic designer.

In 2008, she moved from Paris to New York to explore her own practice. Diallo was mentored by photographer and artist Peter Beard, who was impressed by her creativity and spontaneity before offering her to collaborate for the Pirelli calendar photo shoot in Botswana. Inspired by new environments on this trip, she decided to return to her father's home city of Saint-Louis in Senegal to start her own vision quest.

Seeking to challenge the norms of our society, Diallo immerses herself in the realm of anthropology, mythology, religion, science and martial arts to release her mind. Diallo combines artistry with activism, pushing the many possibilities of empowering women, youth, and cultural minorities through visual provocation. Diallo uses analog, digital photography and collages as she continues to explore new mediums. She is working towards creating new dimensions and a place where consciousness and art are a universal language by connecting artists, sharing ideas and learning.

== Selected exhibitions and series ==
- 2023: Highness
- 2019: African Spirits, Yossi Milo Gallery / Fisheye Gallery
- 2019: MIA Photo fair – Italia / Fisheye Gallery
- 2019: Photo London / Somerset House / Fisheye Gallery
- 2018: Art Basel Miami No Commission
- 2018: Paris Photo / Fisheye Gallery
- 2018: Les rencontres d Arles / Fisheye Gallery Paris "Invisible Symbole"
- 2018: Cambridge - Resignification, The Ethelbert Cooper Gallery
- 2018: ''The Grace of Black Women, National Arts Club in New York
- 2017: No Commission, Berlin, Curated by Swizz Beats and the Dean Collection, Germany
- 2016: Unseen Photo Fair, Red Hook Lab Gallery, Brooklyn, New York
- 2016: No Commission NY. Curated by Swizz Beats and The Dean Collection, Bronx, New York
- 2015: Looking for America, Diffusion, Cardiff International Festival of Photography, Wales
- 2015: Photoquai, 5ème Biennale des images du monde, Musée du Quai Branly, Paris, France
- 2014: Intangible Beauty, Part I & II, Kasher Potamkin Gallery, New York, New York
- 2014: Portraits by Delphine Diallo. Curated by Jamel Shabazz, Photoville, Brooklyn, New York
- 2014: Harlem Postcards, Studio Museum in Harlem, New York
- 2013: Emerging: Visual Art & Music in a Post-Hip-Hop Era, Museum of Contemporary African Diasporic Art, Brooklyn, New York
- 2013: Freedom Ride, Brooklyn Academy of Music, New York
- 2012: Highness / Magic Photo Studio, Addis Foto Fest, Ethiopia
- 2012: Africa, See You, See Me, Dak’Art OFF, Goethe-Institut, Dakar, Senegal
- 2012: The Great Vision, Mariane Ibrahim Abdi (M.I.A.) Gallery, Seattle, Washington
- 2012: Configured, Benrimon Contemporary, New York, New York
- 2012: Voice of Home, Jenkins Johnson Gallery, New York, New York
- 2011: Curate NYC, online exhibitions and guest curated shows, New York
- 2011: Pixelating: Black image in the age of digital reproduction, Lambent Foundation, Museum of Contemporary African Diasporic Art, Brooklyn, New York
- 2011: The African Continuum, United Nations, New York, New York
- 2011: Selected mixed media works, Opera Gallery, New York, New York
- 2011: Are You a Hybrid?, Museum of Art and Design, New York, New York
- 2011: Africa, See You, See Me, Fondazione Studio Marangoni & Officine Fotografiche, Rome, Italy
- 2011: The Black Portrait. Curated by Hank Willis Thomas and Natasha L. Logan, RUSH Art Gallery, New York, New York
- 2010: Africa, See You, See Me, Museu da Cidade, Lisboa, Portugal

== General references ==
- Pallwein-Prettner, Sophia (1 May 2021). "Delphine Diallo: artist analysis archive". Global Contemporary Artist Analysis Archive.
