= Jean Louis Lassaigne =

French chemist (1800–1859)

- Born: 22 September 1800; Paris
- Died: 18 March 1859 (aged 58); Paris
- Known for: sodium fusion test
- Scientific career
- Fields: chemistry

Jean Louis Lassaigne (22 September 1800 – 18 March 1859) was a French chemist. He is best known for the sodium fusion test named after him.

== Early life ==
Lassaigne was born in Paris. Initially he worked in the laboratory of Louis Nicolas Vauquelin, and in 1828 was named professor of chemistry and physics at the École Royale Vétérinaire d’Alfort (Royal School of Veterinary) in Maisons-Alfort. He filled this role until 1854.

== Contributions and major works ==
In 1825 Lassaigne partnered with François Leuret to publish "Recherches physiques et chimiques pour servir à l’historie de la digestion" (Physical and chemical research for understanding digestion). Four years later Lassaigne wrote an investigation about chemistry as part of medical sciences "Abrégé élémentaire de chimie considérée comme science accessoire à l'étude de la médecine, de la pharmacie et de l'histoire naturelle" (Elementary summary of chemistry considered as an ancillary science to the study of medicine, pharmacy and natural history), at the same time he was admitted as member to prestigious "Société de Chimie Médicale" (Medical Chemistry Society) in Paris.

He became a chemical researcher, where he did research related to pure chemistry, inorganic chemistry, industrial chemistry, animal chemistry, and forensic chemistry, which led to many discoveries. His major works were studies about phosphoric ether, pyrocitric acid, pyro acids of the malic acid, chromium salts, and compounds of iodine. Lassaigne also did research on processes for the carbonization of organic matter.

Lassaigne discovered new alkaloids and made major investigations related to toxicology of phosphorus and hydrocyanic acid. He also discovered new dyes, and in 1831 won an award by "Société d'Encouragement de l'Industrie" (Society for Encouragement of Industry) for his work on the process of enamel elaboration for pottery.

In 1843, Lassaigne presented a procedure for detecting the presence of nitrogen in organic compounds by heating them with molten potassium. This procedure was later extended to the detection of sulfur and halogens in organic compounds.
