= Sunrise Dam Gold Mine =

Gold mine in Western Australia

Sunrise Dam
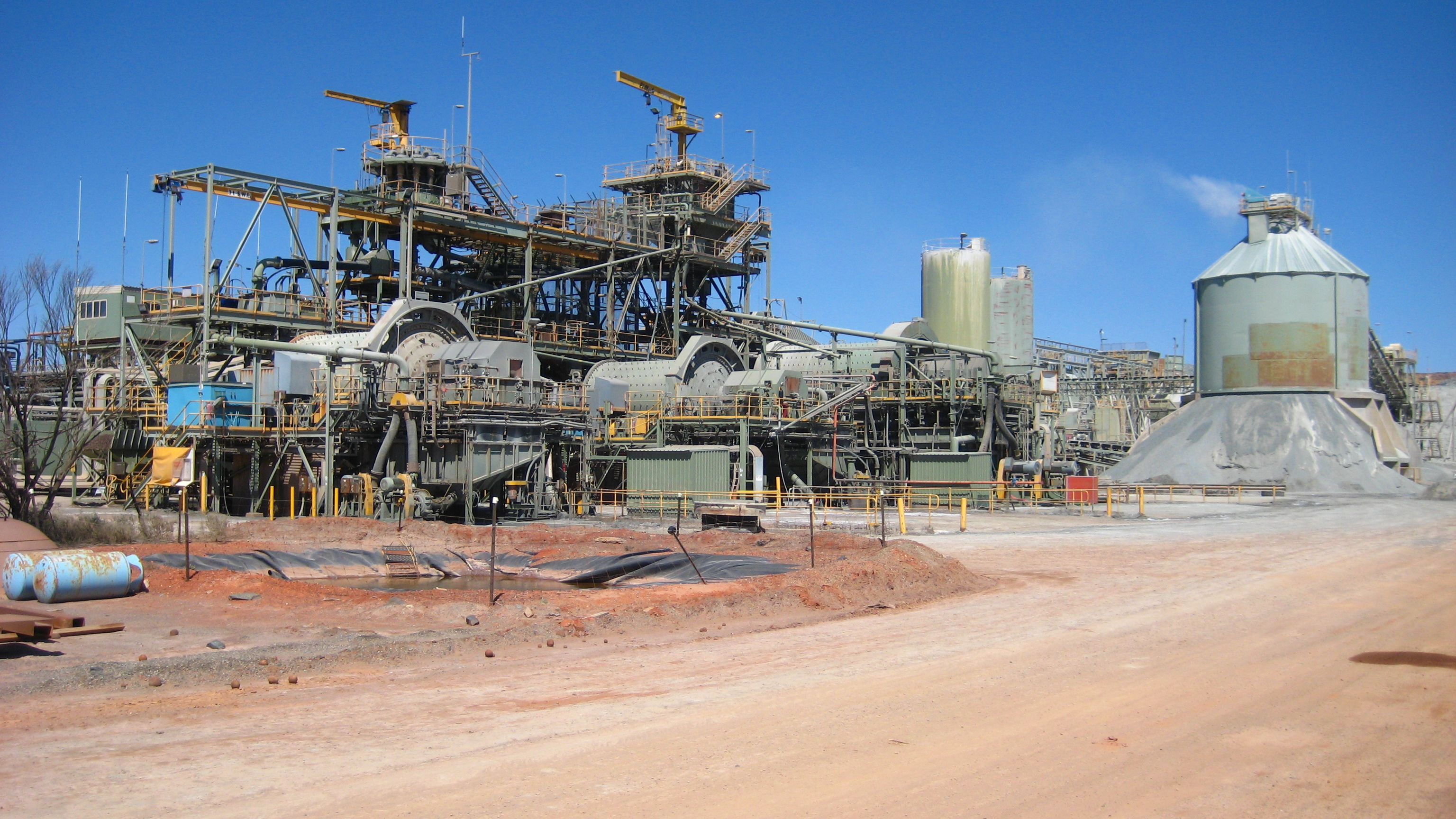
- Plant at Sunrise Dam Gold Mine

- Location in Western Australia
- Interactive map of Sunrise Dam
- Location: Laverton, Western Australia, Australia; 29°04′52″S 122°25′03″E
- Products: Gold
- Production: 232,000 troy ounces
- Financial year: 2022
- Opened: 1996
- Company: AngloGold Ashanti
- Website: www.anglogoldashanti.com
- Acquired: 1999

The Sunrise Dam Gold Mine is located 55 km south of Laverton, Western Australia, on the eastern margin of Lake Carey. It is fully owned by AngloGold Ashanti and comprises a large-scale mechanized underground mine with a conventional gravity and leach process plant. In 2015 the mine accounted for 5% of the company's production.

== History ==
Gold mines in the Kalgoorlie - Leonora region

The gold deposit was originally co-owned by the Granny Smith Joint Venture (Placer Pacific Ltd and Delta Gold NL), which called its eastern portion "Sunrise", and by Acacia Resources Ltd, which called its western portion "Cleo".

The Sunrise portion was found in August 1988, after a 500m by 500m BLEG survey. The Sunrise mine commenced operations in May 1995.

The Cleo portion was first indicated by tenement-wide rotary air blast and aircore drilling in 1991. Acacia Resources commenced production in February 1997, with the first gold pour in March that year. The Sunrise Dam gold mine was officially opened by Premier of Western Australia Richard Court on 6 August 1997.

In 1999, AngloGold acquired the mine through a takeover of Acacia Resources Ltd, a move that also gained it a 33% stake in the Boddington project, which it sold in early 2009 for $1.5 billion. Acacia, originally formed and listed in 1994 when Shell Australia divested its gold and base metal activities, was delisted from the Australian Stock Exchange on 11 January 2000.

An upgrade to the processing plant took place in 2001, the expansion initially designed for 2.5Mtpa, however by year-end plant throughput had been further increased to 3Mtpa. As a result, gold production increased by 31% in 2001, to 295,000oz. A major cutback in the Cleo pit was completed during the year, whilst the corporate office was restructured and relocated from Melbourne to Perth.

Following the capital expansions undertaken the previous year, gold production increased by 30% in 2002 to 382,000oz, as plant throughput rose by 41% to an annual rate of 3.4Mtpa. After completion of a major cutback at the end of 2001, mining in the Mega Pit reached full capacity in the first half of 2002. A smaller cutback, in the Watu section of the pit, was approved during the year.

In December 2002 AngloGold purchased the Sunrise lease from Placer Dome, obtaining control of the entire mineralised system at Sunrise Dam.

During the first half of 2004 an underground scoping study was completed. Deep drilling indicated the sub-vertical, high-grade zones, that had been a feature of open-cut mining at Sunrise Dam, continued at depth. Underground mining commenced later that year, initially as a three-year feasibility project incorporating two declines in the vicinity of defined underground reserves. The primary decline was named the Daniel Decline, after prominent local indigenous businessman Daniel Tucker.

Abnormally heavy rainfall limited access to high-grade ore in the pit early in 2004. As a result, mining moved into the higher-grade Watu section of the orebody, with production increasing by 15% to 410,000 ounces. First gold produced from the underground mine was in the fourth quarter of 2004.

In 2005, open cut mining continued in the high-grade areas in the first half of the year, then onto the lower grade northern section of the pit from the third quarter. Open pit ore was supplemented in the processing plant by higher grade underground ore. Gold production increased by 11% to 455,000 ounces.

Production increased slightly in 2006 to 465,000 ounces. Mining concentrated on the high-grade GQ lode in the open pit. Mining from the known underground reserves increased significantly, especially in the Sunrise and Western Shear zones. Gold production from the underground mine was 67,000 ounces. Record throughput of 3.9Mtpa was achieved in the process plant as a result of additional crushing and grinding circuit optimization.

In 2006, AngloGold Ashanti signed a contract for conversion of its diesel power generators to liquefied natural gas (LNG) as a cost-saving measure as well as to protect the environment. The conversion was delayed by an explosion at the Varanus Island gas production installation and subsequent 2008 Western Australian gas crisis. The LNG-powered facility at Sunrise Dam began operation in the first quarter of 2009.

2007 saw production increase by 29% to a record 600,000 ounces. The GQ zone in the open pit provided the anticipated large volumes of high grade ore. Approximately 79,000 ounces of gold production was sourced from the underground mine. Progress was made in developing access to the Cosmo, Dolly and Watu lodes. A cutback of the north wall of the open pit began (North Wall Cutback), while the underground life of mine study was completed.

Production decreased by 28% in 2008 to 433,000 ounces, as mining of the high-grade ore in the base of the Mega Pit was completed, with the pit reaching a depth of 440 metres. Mill feed comprised stockpiled ore and approximately 73,000 ounces of gold production was sourced from the underground mine.

Open pit mining continued in the North Wall Cutback throughout 2009, whilst underground tonnage increased by 15%, yielding approximately 111,000oz. Overall production for 2009 decreased by 7%, to 401,000oz, equivalent to 9% of group gold production. A paste fill plant was constructed to enable larger stopes to be extracted.

396,000oz was produced in 2010, with the North Wall Cutback providing over 80% of production. Ore continued to be sourced from a combination of underground and open pit operations, with the use of lower-grade stockpiles to supplement the ore feed to the plant. The transition to underground ore continued during 2010.

There were two significant events during 2011 that negatively impacted production, with production falling to 246,000oz. A major flood occurred in February, when 220mm of rain fell in two storms, less than five days apart. This was the highest rainfall recorded in the 129 years of records for the Laverton district. In April, a wall failed in the south-eastern portion of the open pit, which prevented access to the open pit working areas. A new access ramp was constructed, which took approximately six months. The flood event impacted underground production for approximately four months. No injuries were sustained in either event, or in the work required to re-establish production.

A study was undertaken during 2011 to test the potential for a bulk-cave operation to more efficiently extract underground ore over an extended life of mine. The study demonstrated that substantial tonnage could be mined via more productive and cost effective long hole open stoping methods.

Production rose by 5% to 258,000oz in 2012, as Sunrise Dam recovered from flood-related disruptions the previous year, together with improved grades from the North Wall Cutback area of the pit. An insurance payout of A$30 million related to the 2011 pit wall failure was offset against cash costs.

After more than 17 years of operation, the open pit was completed in 2013 to a depth of 490m below surface. Production increased to 276,000oz as higher grade ore from the Crown Pillar in the base of the open pit was processed. During the year studies were undertaken into the feasibility and advantages of piping natural gas for power generation, as an alternative to diesel.

The underground mine transitioned to become the primary source of mill feed in 2014, delivering 2.43Mt of ore to the mill for the year. Stockpiled intermediate grade ore (average 1.45g/t) was blended with the underground ore to meet the processing plant capacity. In July 2014, AngloGold Ashanti signed agreements with a natural gas infrastructure company for the transportation of natural gas to Sunrise Dam and Tropicana Gold Mine.

Production was 46,000oz lower in 2015 due to lower mined grades, with underground mining primarily on the periphery of the main ore bodies. The mine began transitioning to the Vogue ore body. A study commenced to assess the viability of an underground crusher and conveyor system for haulage via a new decline at the northern end of the operation.

Completion of the Eastern Goldfields Pipeline in December 2015 delivered natural gas ahead of schedule to Sunrise Dam and Tropicana Gold Mine. The switch to natural gas at Sunrise Dam involved the installation of two new gas generation sets. The pipeline was officially opened by the Western Australian Minister for Mines and Petroleum, the Honourable Bill Marmion, in February 2016.

== Present day ==
Mining is carried out by contractors and ore is treated in a conventional gravity and leach process plant, which is owner-managed.

The majority of the mine workers are on a fly-in fly-out roster, with National Jet Express providing a charter service twice-daily from Monday to Friday.

Sunrise Dam supports the Laverton community through its involvement with the Laverton Mining Liaison Committee and representation on the Laverton Leonora Cross Cultural Association. Sunrise Dam also supports and encourages the development of a number of local businesses, including Carey Mining, an indigenous-owned mining contractor.

Sunrise Dam continues to maintain certification to OHSAS 18001, ISO 14001 and the International Cyanide Management Code. A mine closure plan is in place, with waste dumps and paddock tailings dams progressively rehabilitated in line with this plan.

== Geology ==
Gold ore at Sunrise Dam is structurally and lithologically controlled within gently dipping high strain shear zones (for example, the Sunrise Shear) and steeply dipping brittle-ductile low strain shear zones (for example, the Western Shear). Host rocks include andesitic volcanic rocks, volcanogenic sediments and magnetic shales.

Sunrise Dam images

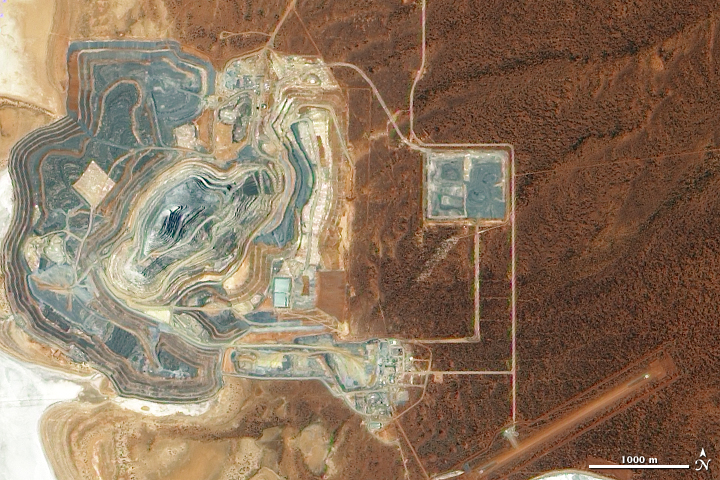
Sunrise Dam Gold Mine, 2009 NASA satellite image.

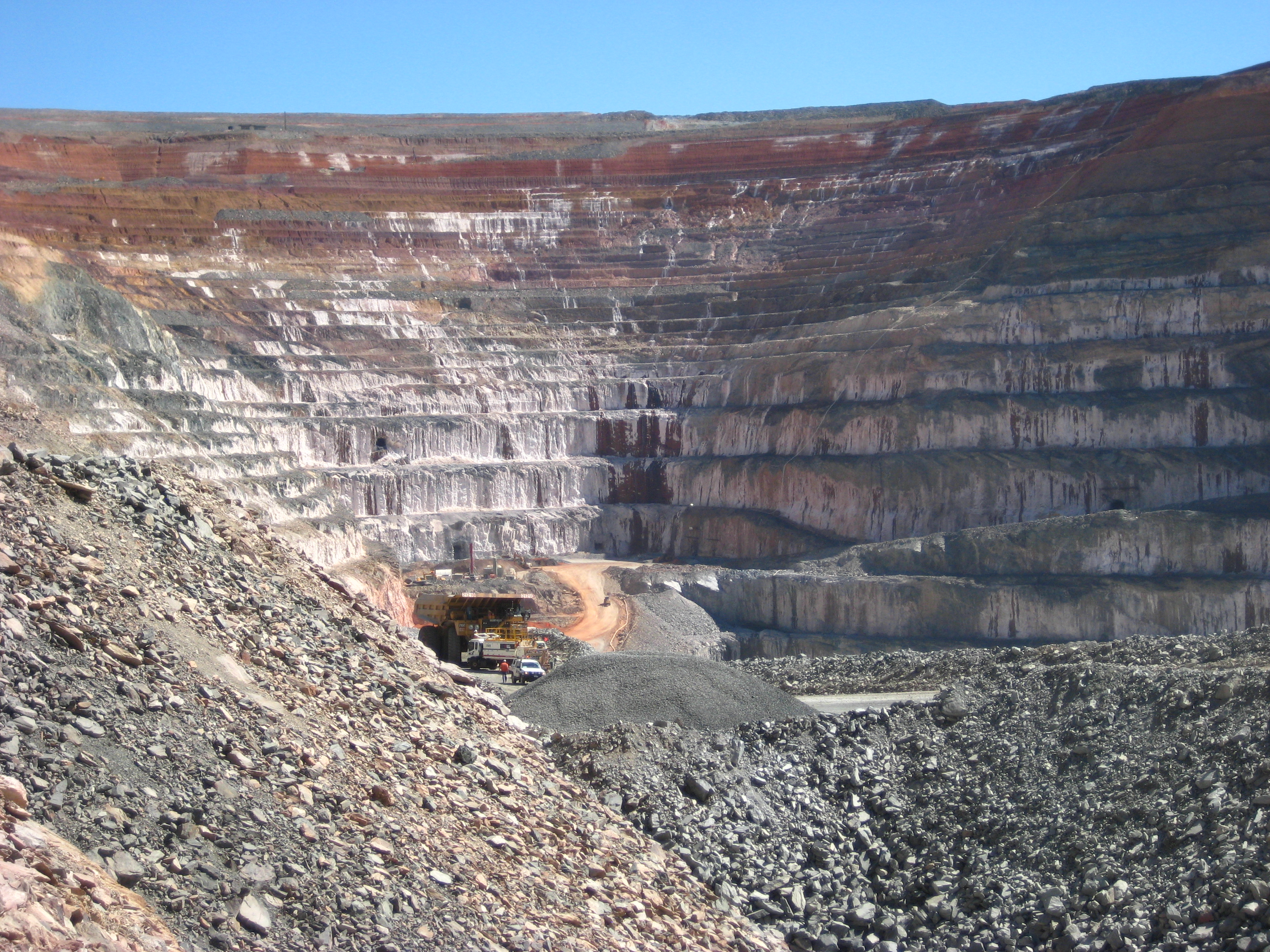
Sunrise Dam open pit operations.

== Production ==
Past production figures were:

| Year | Production | Grade | Cost per ounce |
|---|---|---|---|
| 1997 | 144,828 ounces^{[A]} | 5.61 g/t | A$169 |
| 1998 | 190,757 ounces^{[A]} | 4.84 g/t | A$148 |
| 1999 | 198,139 ounces^{[A]} | 4.31 g/t | US$143 |
| 2000 | 225,000 ounces^{[A]} | 3.91 g/t | US$172 |
| 2001 | 295,000 ounces^{[A]} | 3.81 g/t | US$153 |
| 2002 | 382,000 ounces | 3.49 g/t | US$177 |
| 2003 | 358,000 ounces | 3.12 g/t | US$228 |
| 2004 | 410,000 ounces | 3.46 g/t | US$260 |
| 2005 | 455,000 ounces | 3.68 g/t | US$269 |
| 2006 | 465,000 ounces | 3.39 g/t | US$298 |
| 2007 | 600,000 ounces | 4.86 g/t | US$306 |
| 2008 | 433,000 ounces | 3.46 g/t | US$531 |
| 2009 | 401,000 ounces | 2.87 g/t | US$646 |
| 2010 | 396,000 ounces | 3.22 g/t | US$957 |
| 2011 | 246,000 ounces | 2.16 g/t | US$1367 |
| 2012 | 258,000 ounces | 2.39 g/t | US$1126 |
| 2013 | 276,000 ounces | 2.46 g/t | US$1110 |
| 2014 | 262,000 ounces | 2.13 g/t | US$1105 |
| 2015 | 216,000 ounces | 1.97 g/t | US$970 |
| 2016 | 228,000 ounces | 1.98 g/t | US$926 |
| 2017 | 238,000 ounces | 2.02 g/t | US$919 |
| 2018 | 289,000 ounces | 2.23 g/t | US$1,230 |
| 2019 | 254,000 ounces | 1.93 g/t | US$1,246 |
| 2020 | 256,000 ounces | 1,97 g/t | US$1,320 |
| 2021 | 229,000 ounces | 1.76 g/t | US$1,573 |
| 2022 | 232,000 ounces | 1.83 g/t | US$1,666 |

=== Notes ===
- ^[A] Figures for Acacia/AngloGold portion of the deposit only
