= Silver(II) sulfate =

Names
- Other names: Argentic sulfate

Identifiers
CAS Number	16106-39-1
3D model (JSmol)	Interactive image
ChemSpider	10716397
PubChem CID	14620146
- InChI: InChI=1S/Ag.H2O4S/c;1-5(2,3)4/h;(H2,1,2,3,4)/q+2;/p-2
- SMILES: O=S(=O)([O-])[O-].[Ag+2]

Properties
Chemical formula	AgSO_{4}
Molar mass	203.93 g/mol
Appearance	Black solid
Density	4.46 g/cm^{3}
Melting point	126 °C (259 °F; 399 K) (decomposition)
Solubility in water	Reacts
Solubility	Insoluble in sulfuric acid and organic solvents

Related compounds
Other cations	Copper(II) sulfate Gold(II) sulfate
Related compounds	Silver(I) sulfate
- Except where otherwise noted, data are given for materials in their standard state (at 25 °C [77 °F], 100 kPa). Infobox references

Silver(II) sulfate is an inorganic chemical compound with the formula AgSO_{4}. A lesser-known silver sulfate compared to the much more common silver(I) sulfate, it is a black solid that also forms the monohydrate, AgSO_{4}·H_{2}O, which is also a black solid.

== Preparation and structure ==
Silver(II) sulfate is prepared by the reaction of silver(II) fluoride and sulfuric acid:

AgF_{2} + H_{2}SO_{4} → AgSO_{4} + 2 HF

Different reaction temperatures produce different polymorphs. The reaction at –35 °C produces the more common α form, while the reaction at 70 °C produces a mixture of the α and β forms.

α-AgSO_{4} can also be produced electrochemically by the electrolysis of a solution of silver(I) sulfate in sulfuric acid. This method produces a purer product than the first method.

The α polymorph, an antiferromagnet isostructural to a high-temperature polymorph of PdSO_{4}, has square-planar AgO_{4} centers which are all linked by SO_{4} tetrahedra. This polymorph is relatively unchanged even at pressures up to 23 GPa. Above this pressure, it decomposes to silver pyrosulfate (Ag_{2}S_{2}O_{7}) with the release of oxygen.

The β polymorph, isostructural to CuSO_{4}, has distorted AgO_{6} octahederas also linked by SO_{4} tetrahedra.

Anhydrous silver(II) sulfate slowly absorbs moisture from air to produce the monohydrate, AgSO_{4}·H_{2}O, which converts back to the anhydrous form when heated to 90 °C. Its structural formula is [Ag(H_{2}O)_{2}][Ag(SO_{4})_{2}], indicating the presence of two different silver atom environments which are linked by SO_{4} bridges.

Crystallographic data for the 3 forms of silver(II) sulfate
Compound	α-AgSO_{4}	β-AgSO_{4}	AgSO_{4}·H_{2}O
Crystal Structure	Monoclinic	Monoclinic	Triclinic
Space Group	C2/c	P2_{1}/n	P1̅
Lattice constant a (Å)	12.85	4.75	5.12
Lattice constant b (Å)	13.67	8.77	5.39
Lattice constant c (Å)	9.37	7.22	7.85
α			107.3°
β	47.6°	94.0°	105.1°
γ			92.4°
Z	16	4	2
Calculated density (g/cm^{3})	4.46	4.51	3.72

== Properties and reactions ==
Anhydrous silver(II) sulfate slowly hydrates in air to the monohydrate. The monohydrate is air-stable; however, any impurities catalyze the reduction to silver(I) sulfate. The monohydrate releases water, forming the anhydrous form (α polymorph) when heated to 90 °C, which in turn exothermically decomposes to silver pyrosulfate (Ag_{2}S_{2}O_{7}) at 126 °C:

2 AgSO_{4} → 2 Ag_{2}S_{2}O_{7} + O_{2}

On the other hand, the β polymorph decomposes at 220 °C also to silver pyrosulfate. The resulting silver pyrosulfate decomposes at 344 °C to silver(I) sulfate with the release of sulfur trioxide:

Ag_{2}S_{2}O_{7} → Ag_{2}SO_{4} + SO_{3}

== Applications ==
Silver(II) sulfate has no applications, but is being studied as an oxidizing agent in organic chemistry, such as in the C-C coupling of aromatic systems.
