= Interactive (disambiguation) =

Interactive is defined as:

- Interactivity, acting with each other, two interactive systems
- Interactive computing, responding to the user

== Companies ==
- IAC/InterActiveCorp, an Internet company
- Interactive Systems Corporation (ISC), a defunct software company

== Music ==
- "Interactive", song by Prince Crystal Ball (box set)
- Interactive (band), an electronic music group

== See also ==
- Interact (disambiguation)
- Interaction (disambiguation)
