= RQC =

RQC may refer to:

- Relativistic quantum chemistry, a subfield of quantum chemistry.
- Remote Access Quarantine Client, a program, rqc.exe, in the Windows Server 2003 operating system.
