= Aurophilicity =

Tendency of gold complexes to aggregate

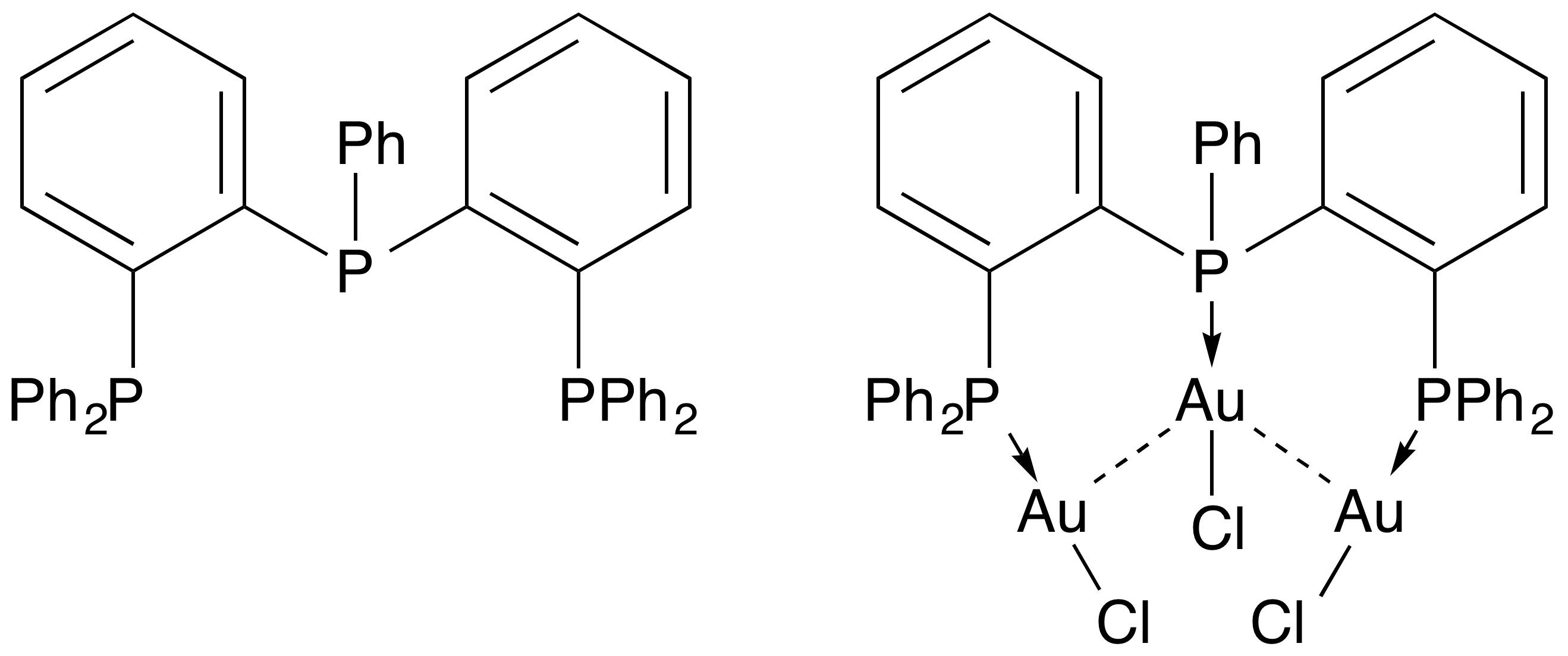
When the ligand on the left is treated with 3 equivalents of a gold(I) halide (with each phosphine group coordinating a separate gold center), the aurophilic interaction between gold atoms hinders free rotation around single bonds. The temperature required to restore free rotation on the NMR timescale is a measure of the strength of the aurophilic interaction.

In chemistry, aurophilicity refers to the tendency of gold complexes to aggregate via formation of weak metallophilic interactions.

The main evidence for aurophilicity is from the crystallographic analysis of Au(I) complexes. The aurophilic bond has a length of about 3.0 Å and a strength of about 7–12 kcal/mol, which is comparable to the strength of a hydrogen bond. The effect is greatest for gold as compared with copper or silver—the higher elements in its periodic table group—due to increased relativistic effects. Observations and theory show that, on average, 28% of the binding energy in the aurophilic interaction can be attributed to relativistic expansion of the gold d orbitals.

An example of aurophilicity is the propensity of gold centres to aggregate. While both intramolecular and intermolecular aurophilic interactions have been observed, only intramolecular aggregation has been observed at such nucleation sites.

== Role in self-assembly ==
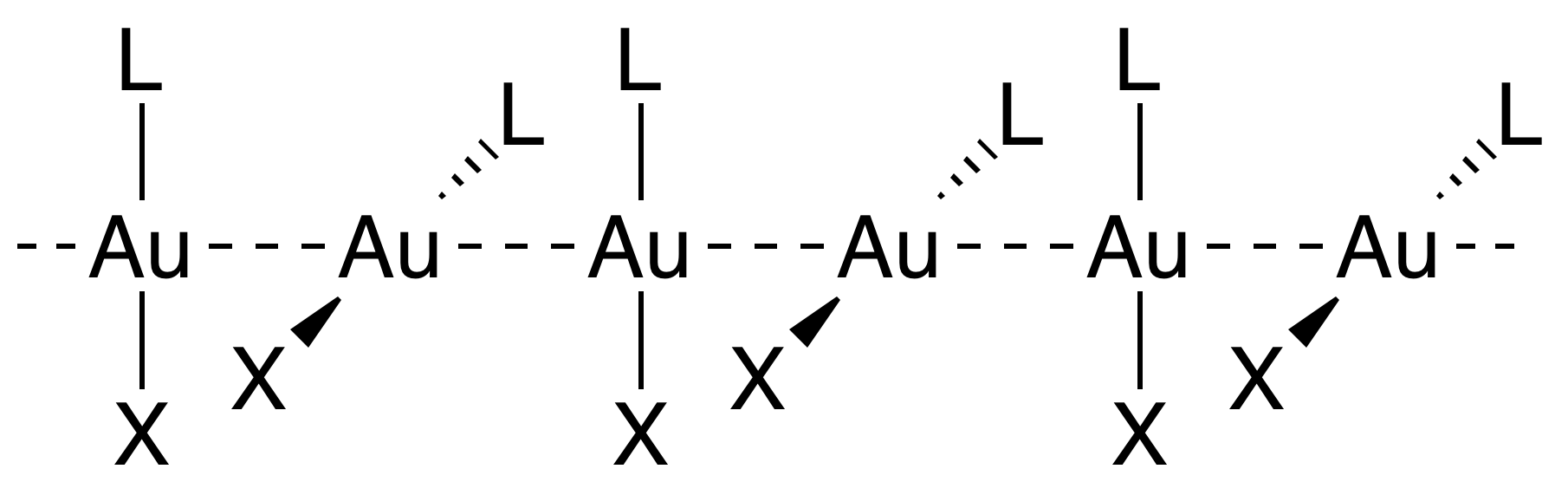
Gold(I) complexes can polymerize by intermolecular aurophilic interaction. Nanoparticles that form from this polymerization often give rise to intense luminescence in the visible region of the spectrum. Strength of particular intermolecular aurophilic interactions can be gauged by solvating the nanoparticles and observing the extent to which luminescence diminishes.

The similarity in strength between hydrogen bonding and aurophilic interaction has proven to be a convenient tool in the field of polymer chemistry. Much research has been conducted on self-assembling supramolecular structures, both those that aggregate by aurophilicity alone and those that contain both aurophilic and hydrogen-bonding interactions. An important and exploitable property of aurophilic interactions relevant to their supramolecular chemistry is that while both inter- and intramolecular interactions are possible, intermolecular aurophilic linkages are comparatively weak and easily broken by solvation; most complexes that exhibit intramolecular aurophilic interactions retain such moieties in solution.
