= Interact =

Interact may refer to:

- InterAct, a Miami, Florida video game accessory producer most known for producing the GameShark.
- interACT, trade name of Advocates for Informed Choice
- Subsidiaries of U.S. software and consulting company Advanced Computer Techniques:
  - Inter-ACT
  - Inter-Act
  - InterACT (Advanced Computer Techniques)
- InterACT Disability Arts Festival, a three-day New Zealand event begun in 2011
- Interact Home Computer, a briefly-extant 1979 U.S. personal computer
- InterAct Theatre Company, a U.S. organization based in Philadelphia, founded in 1988
- InterAct, a subsidiary of Recoton that owned the GameShark brand for a while
- Rotary Interact, a service club for youths that is part of Rotary International

== See also ==
- Interac
- Interaction (disambiguation)
- Interactive (disambiguation)
