= Metallophilic interaction =

Non-covalent attraction between heavy metal atoms

In chemistry, a metallophilic interaction is defined as a type of non-covalent attraction between heavy metal atoms. The atoms are often within Van der Waals distance of each other and are about as strong as hydrogen bonds. The effect can be intramolecular or intermolecular. Intermolecular metallophilic interactions can lead to formation of supramolecular assemblies whose properties vary with the choice of element and oxidation states of the metal atoms and the attachment of various ligands to them.

The nature of such interactions remains the subject of vigorous debate with recent studies emphasizing that the metallophilic interaction is repulsive due to strong metal-metal Pauli exclusion principle repulsion.

== Nature of the interaction ==
Previously, this type of interaction was considered to be enhanced by relativistic effects. A major contributor is electron correlation of the closed-shell components, which is unusual because closed-shell atoms generally have negligible interaction with one another at the distances observed for the metal atoms. As a trend, the effect becomes larger moving down a periodic table group, for example, from copper to silver to gold, in keeping with increased relativistic effects. Observations and theory find that, on average, 28% of the binding energy in gold–gold interactions can be attributed to relativistic expansion of the gold d orbitals.

Recently, the relativistic effect was found to enhance the intermolecular M-M Pauli repulsion of the closed-shell organometallic complexes. At close M–M distances, metallophilicity is repulsive in nature due to strong M–M Pauli repulsion. The relativistic effect facilitates (n + 1)s-nd and (n + 1)p-nd orbital hybridization of the metal atom, where (n + 1)s-nd hybridization induces strong M–M Pauli repulsion and repulsive M–M orbital interaction, and (n + 1)p-nd hybridization suppresses M–M Pauli repulsion. This model is validated by both DFT (density functional theory) and high-level CCSD(T) (coupled-cluster singles and doubles with perturbative triples) computations.

An important and exploitable property of aurophilic interactions relevant to their supramolecular chemistry is that while both inter- and intramolecular interactions are possible, intermolecular aurophilic linkages are comparatively weak and the gold–gold bonds are easily broken by solvation; most complexes that exhibit intramolecular aurophilic interactions retain such moieties in solution. One way of probing the strength of particular intermolecular metallophilic interactions is to use a competing solvent and examine how it interferes with supromolecular properties. For example, adding various solvents to gold(I) nanoparticles whose luminescence is attributed to Au–Au interactions will have decreasing luminescence as the solvent disrupts the metallophilic interactions.

== Applications ==
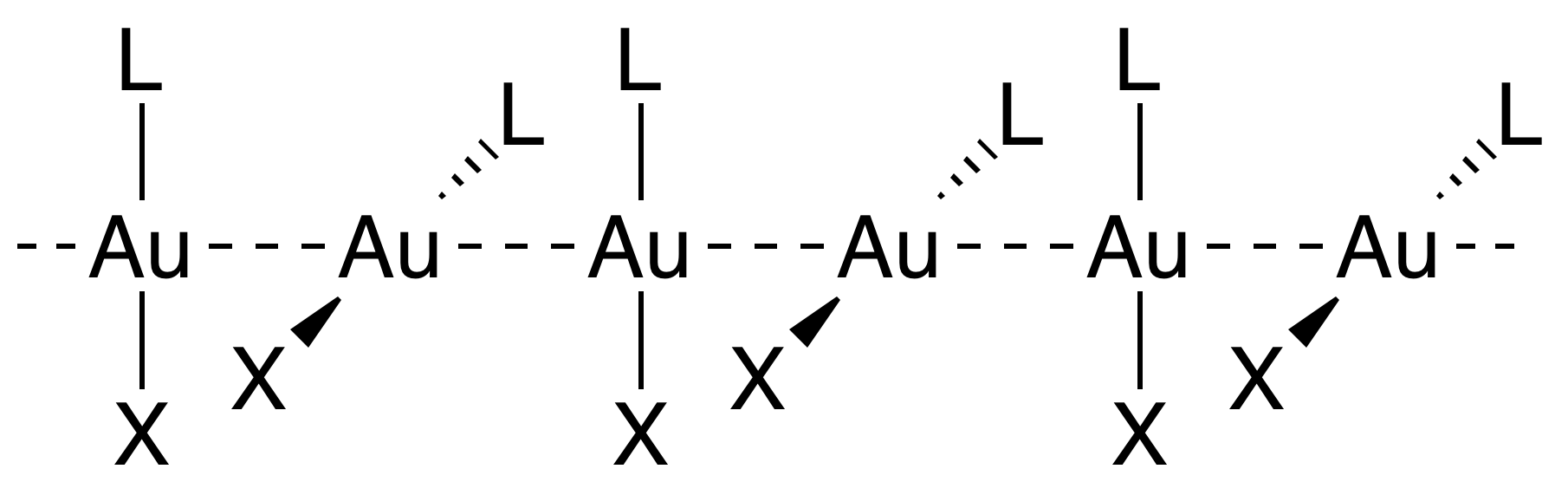
Gold(I) complexes can polymerize by intermolecular metallophilic interactions to form nanoparticles.

The polymerization of metal atoms can lead to the formation of long chains or nucleated clusters. Gold nanoparticles formed from chains of gold(I) complexes linked by aurophilic interactions often give rise to intense luminescence in the visible region of the spectrum.

Chains of Pd(II)–Pd(I) and Pt(II)–Pd(I) complexes have been explored as potential molecular wires.

== See also ==
- Metal aromaticity
