= Interaction =

Interaction is action that occurs between two or more entities, generally used in philosophy and the sciences. It may refer to:

== Science ==
- Interaction hypothesis, a theory of second language acquisition
- Interaction (statistics), when three or more variables influence each other
- Interactions of actors theory, created by cybernetician Gordon Pask
- Fundamental interaction or fundamental force, the core interactions in physics
- Human–computer interaction, interfaces for people using computers
- Social interaction between people

=== Biology ===
- Biological interaction
- Cell–cell interaction
- Drug interaction
- Gene–environment interaction
- Protein–protein interaction

=== Chemistry ===
- Aromatic interaction
- Cation-pi interaction
- Metallophilic interaction

== Arts and media ==
- Interaction (album), 1963, by Art Farmer's Quartet
- ACM Interactions, a magazine published by the Association for Computing Machinery
- "Interactions" (The Spectacular Spider-Man), an episode of the animated television series
- 63rd World Science Fiction Convention, titled Interaction

== See also ==
- Interact (disambiguation)
