= Gold =

Gold, _{79}Au
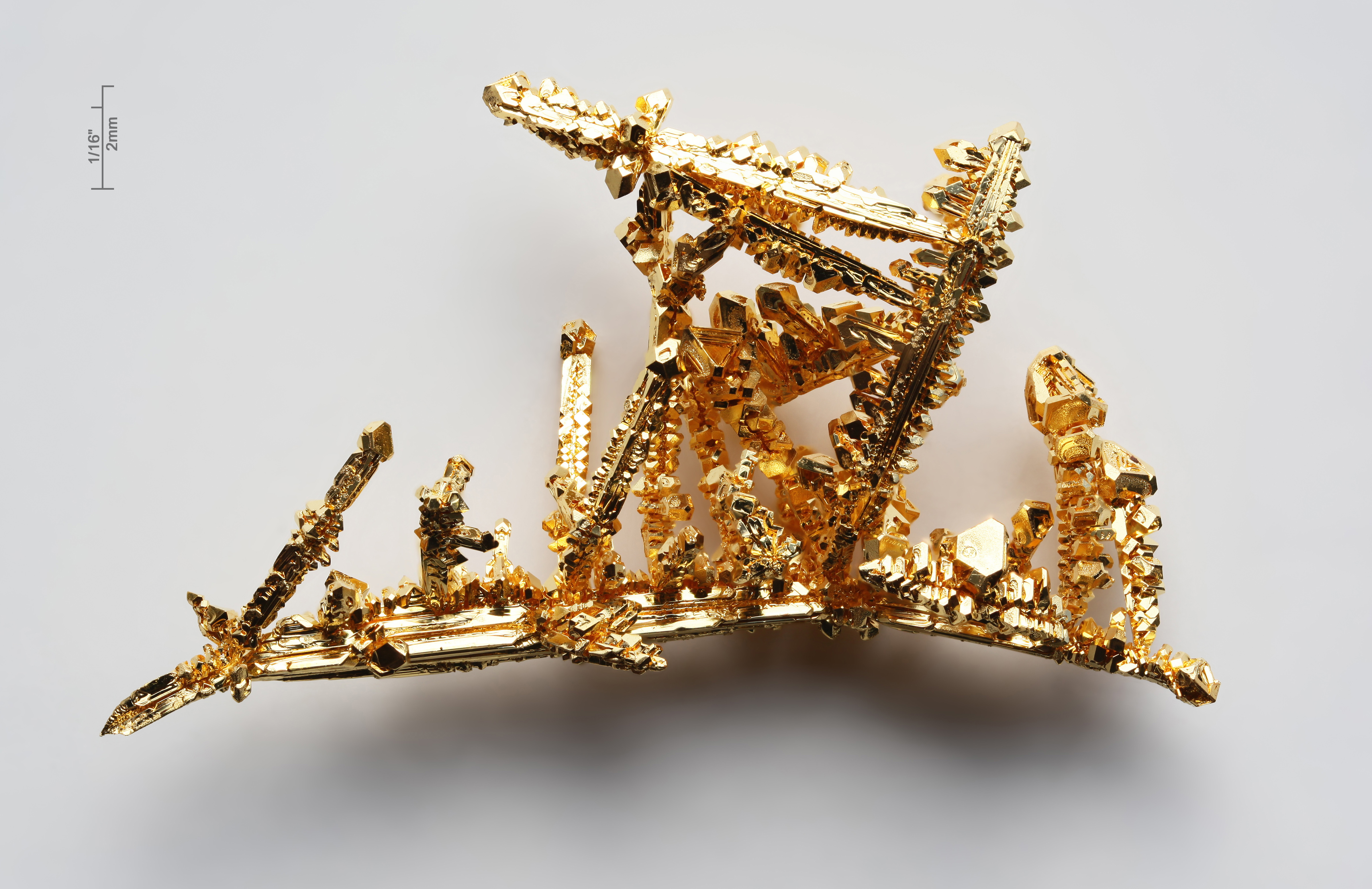

Gold
- Alternative name: Aurum, pronounced: /ˈɔːrəm/ (AW-rəm)
- Appearance: Metallic yellow

Standard atomic weight A_{r}°(Au)
- 196.966570±0.000004; 196.97±0.01 (abridged)

Gold in the periodic table
Hydrogen																															Helium
Lithium	Beryllium																									Boron	Carbon	Nitrogen	Oxygen	Fluorine	Neon
Sodium	Magnesium																									Aluminium	Silicon	Phosphorus	Sulfur	Chlorine	Argon
Potassium	Calcium															Scandium	Titanium	Vanadium	Chromium	Manganese	Iron	Cobalt	Nickel	Copper	Zinc	Gallium	Germanium	Arsenic	Selenium	Bromine	Krypton
Rubidium	Strontium															Yttrium	Zirconium	Niobium	Molybdenum	Technetium	Ruthenium	Rhodium	Palladium	Silver	Cadmium	Indium	Tin	Antimony	Tellurium	Iodine	Xenon
Caesium	Barium	Lanthanum	Cerium	Praseodymium	Neodymium	Promethium	Samarium	Europium	Gadolinium	Terbium	Dysprosium	Holmium	Erbium	Thulium	Ytterbium	Lutetium	Hafnium	Tantalum	Tungsten	Rhenium	Osmium	Iridium	Platinum	Gold	Mercury (element)	Thallium	Lead	Bismuth	Polonium	Astatine	Radon
Francium	Radium	Actinium	Thorium	Protactinium	Uranium	Neptunium	Plutonium	Americium	Curium	Berkelium	Californium	Einsteinium	Fermium	Mendelevium	Nobelium	Lawrencium	Rutherfordium	Dubnium	Seaborgium	Bohrium	Hassium	Meitnerium	Darmstadtium	Roentgenium	Copernicium	Nihonium	Flerovium	Moscovium	Livermorium	Tennessine	Oganesson
Ag
↑
Au
↓
Rg
platinum ← gold → mercury
- Atomic number (Z): 79
- Group: group 11
- Period: period 6
- Block: d-block
- Electron configuration: [Xe] 4f^{14} 5d^{10} 6s^{1}
- Electrons per shell: 2, 8, 18, 32, 18, 1

Physical properties
- Phase at STP: solid
- Melting point: 1337.33 K (1064.18 °C, 1947.52 °F)
- Boiling point: 3243 K (2970 °C, 5378 °F)
- Density (at 20° C): 19.283 g/cm^{3}
- when liquid (at m.p.): 17.31 g/cm^{3}
- Heat of fusion: 12.55 kJ/mol
- Heat of vaporization: 342 kJ/mol
- Molar heat capacity: 25.418 J/(mol·K)
- Specific heat capacity: 129.045 J/(kg·K)
Vapor pressure
P (Pa)	1	10	100	1 k	10 k	100 k
at T (K)	1646	1814	2021	2281	2620	3078

Atomic properties
- Oxidation states: common: +3 −3, −2, −1, 0, +1, +2, +5
- Electronegativity: Pauling scale: 2.54
- Ionization energies: 1st: 890.1 kJ/mol; 2nd: 1980 kJ/mol
- Atomic radius: empirical: 144 pm
- Covalent radius: 136±6 pm
- Van der Waals radius: 166 pm
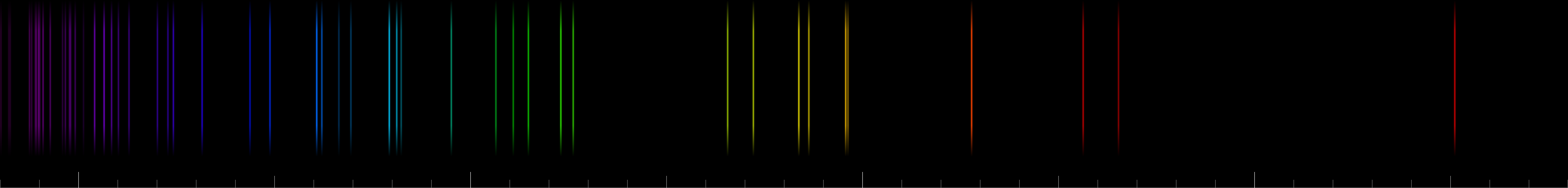
- Spectral lines of gold

Other properties
- Natural occurrence: primordial
- Crystal structure: face-centered cubic (fcc) (cF4)
- Lattice constant: a = 407.86 pm (at 20 °C)
- Thermal expansion: 14.13×10^{−6}/K (at 20 °C)
- Thermal conductivity: 318 W/(m⋅K)
- Electrical resistivity: 22.14 nΩ⋅m (at 20 °C)
- Magnetic ordering: diamagnetic
- Molar magnetic susceptibility: −28.0×10^{−6} cm^{3}/mol (at 296 K)
- Tensile strength: 120 MPa
- Young's modulus: 79 GPa
- Shear modulus: 27 GPa
- Bulk modulus: 180 GPa
- Speed of sound thin rod: 2030 m/s (at r.t.)
- Poisson ratio: 0.4
- Mohs hardness: 2.5
- Vickers hardness: 188–216 MPa
- Brinell hardness: 188–245 MPa
- CAS Number: 7440-57-5

History
- Naming: from a Proto-Indo-European root meaning 'yellow'
- Discovery: In the Middle East (before 6000 BCE)
- Symbol: "Au": from Latin aurum

Isotopes of gold
Main isotopes			Decay	
Isotope	abundance	half-life (t_{1/2})	mode	product
^{195}Au	synth	186.01 d	ε	^{195}Pt
^{196}Au	synth	6.165 d	β^{+}	^{196}Pt
^{196}Au	synth	6.165 d	β^{−}	^{196}Hg
^{197}Au	100%	stable		
^{198}Au	synth	2.6946 d	β^{−}	^{198}Hg
^{199}Au	synth	3.139 d	β^{−}	^{199}Hg

Gold is a chemical element; its chemical symbol is Au (from Latin aurum) and atomic number 79. In its pure form, it is a bright-metallic-yellow, dense, soft, malleable, and ductile metal. Chemically, gold is a transition metal, a group 11 element, and one of the noble metals. It is one of the least reactive chemical elements, being the second lowest in the reactivity series, with only platinum ranked as less reactive. Gold is solid under standard conditions.

Gold often occurs as the free element (native state), as nuggets or grains, in rocks, veins, and alluvial deposits. It occurs in a solid solution series with the native element silver (as in electrum), naturally alloyed with other metals such as copper, platinum, and palladium, as well as mineral inclusions such as within pyrite. Less commonly, it occurs in minerals as gold compounds, often with tellurium (gold tellurides).

Gold is resistant to most acids, though it does dissolve in aqua regia (a mixture of nitric acid and hydrochloric acid), forming a soluble tetrachloroaurate anion. Gold is insoluble in nitric acid alone, which dissolves silver and base metals, a property long used to refine gold and confirm the presence of gold in metallic substances, giving rise to the term "acid test". Gold dissolves in alkaline solutions of cyanide, which are used in mining and electroplating. Gold also dissolves in mercury, forming amalgam alloys, and as the gold acts simply as a solute, this is not a chemical reaction.

A relatively rare element when compared to silver (though thirty times more common than platinum), gold is a precious metal that has been used for coinage, jewelry, and other works of art throughout recorded history. In the past, a gold standard was often implemented as a monetary policy. Most gold coins ceased to be minted as a circulating currency in the 1930s, and the world gold standard was abandoned for a fiat currency system after the Nixon shock measures of 1971.

In 2023, the world's largest gold producer was China, followed by Russia and Australia. As of 2020, a total of around 201,296 tonnes of gold exist above ground. If all of this gold were put together into a cube shape, each of its sides would measure 21.7 meters (71 ft). The world's consumption of new gold produced is about 50% in jewelry, 40% in investments, and 10% in industry. Gold's high malleability, ductility, resistance to corrosion and most other chemical reactions, as well as conductivity of electricity have led to its continued use in corrosion-resistant electrical connectors in all types of computerized devices (its chief industrial use). Gold is also used in infrared shielding, the production of colored glass, gold leafing, and tooth restoration. Auranofin is a gold-containing drug used to treat rheumatoid arthritis.

== Etymology ==
The word gold in the Beowulf manuscript

Gold is cognate with similar words in many Germanic languages, deriving via Proto-Germanic *gulþą from Proto-Indo-European *ǵʰelh₃- 'to shine, to gleam; to be yellow or green'.

The symbol Au is from the Latin aurum 'gold'. The Proto-Indo-European ancestor of aurum was *h₂é-h₂us-o-, meaning 'glow'. This word is derived from the same root (Proto-Indo-European *h₂u̯es- 'to dawn') as *h₂éu̯sōs, the ancestor of the Latin word aurora 'dawn'. This etymological relationship is presumably behind the frequent claim in scientific publications that aurum meant 'shining dawn'.

== Characteristics ==
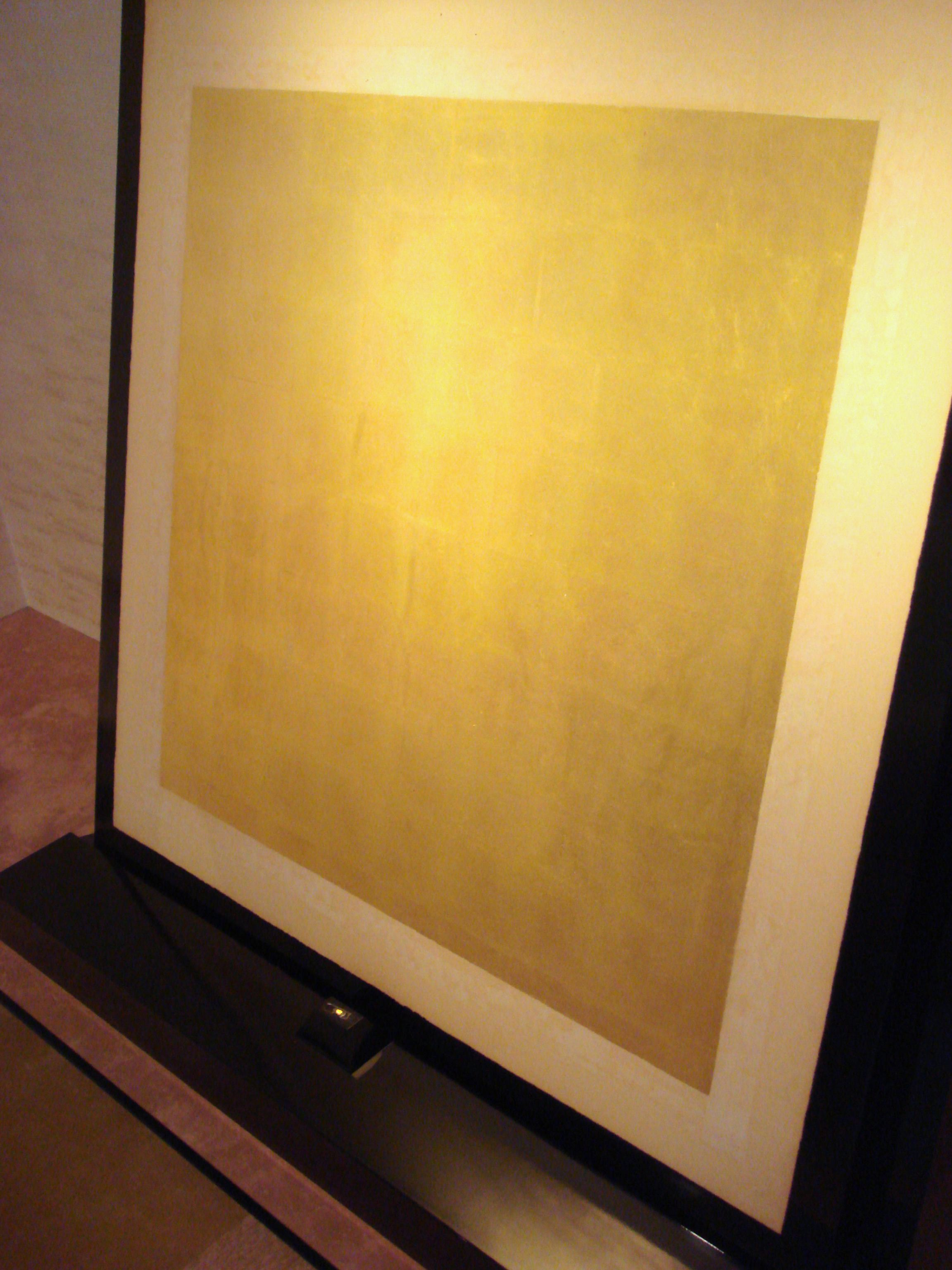
A 5 mm (0.20 in) gold nugget (dot in front of frame) can be hammered into a gold foil of about 0.5 m^{2} (5.4 sq ft) in area.

Gold is the most malleable metal. It can be drawn into a wire of single-atom width, and then stretched considerably before it breaks. Such nanowires distort via the formation, reorientation, and migration of dislocations and crystal twins without noticeable hardening. A single gram of gold can be beaten into a sheet of 1 square meter (11 sq ft), and an avoirdupois ounce into 28 square meters (300 sq ft). Gold leaf can be beaten thin enough to become semi-transparent. Light transmitted through gold appears greenish-blue, because gold strongly reflects yellow and red. Such semi-transparent sheets also strongly reflect infrared light, making them useful as infrared (radiant heat) shields in the visors of heat-resistant suits and in sun visors for spacesuits. Gold is a good conductor of heat and electricity.

Gold has a density of 19.3 g/cm^{3}, almost identical to that of tungsten at 19.25 g/cm^{3}; as such, tungsten has been used in the counterfeiting of gold bars, such as by plating a tungsten bar with gold. By comparison, the density of lead is 11.34 g/cm^{3}, and that of the densest element, osmium, is 22.588±0.015 g/cm^{3}.

=== Color ===
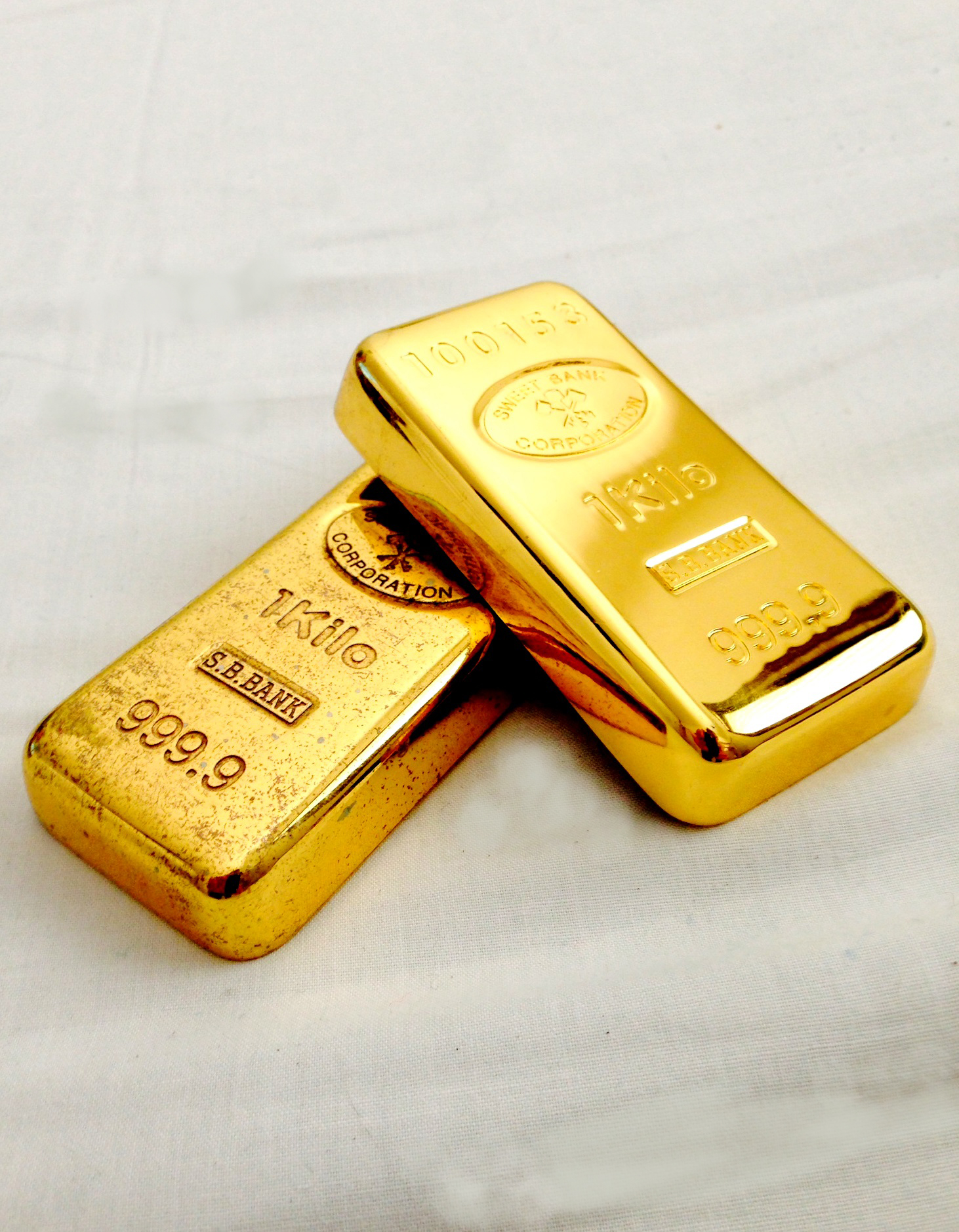
Gold bars, also called ingots or bullion

Different colors of Ag–Au–Cu alloys

Whereas most metals are gray or silvery white, gold is slightly reddish-yellow. This color is a well-known example of relativistic quantum chemistry. The 5d-6s band gap is greatly reduced when relativity is included in theoretical calculations, and this is thought to account for the yellow color, although a full comparison of the absorption spectrum between the relativistic and non-relativistic cases has not been performed as of 2004. Similar effects impart a golden hue to metallic caesium.

Common colored gold alloys include the distinctive eighteen-karat rose gold created by the addition of copper. Alloys containing palladium or nickel are also important in commercial jewelry as these produce white gold alloys. Fourteen-karat gold-copper alloy is nearly identical in color to certain bronze alloys, and both may be used to produce police and other badges. Fourteen- and eighteen-karat gold alloys with silver alone appear greenish-yellow and are referred to as green gold. Blue gold can be made by alloying with iron, and purple gold can be made by alloying with aluminium. Less commonly, addition of manganese, indium, and other elements can produce more unusual colors of gold for various applications.

Colloidal gold, used by electron-microscopists, is red if the particles are small; larger particles of colloidal gold are blue.

=== Isotopes ===
Gold has only one stable isotope, ^{197}Au, which is also its only naturally occurring isotope, so gold is both a mononuclidic and monoisotopic element. Thirty-six radioisotopes have been synthesized, ranging in atomic mass from 169 to 205. The most stable of these is ^{195}Au with a half-life of 186.1 days. The least stable is ^{171}Au, which decays by proton emission with a half-life of 30 μs. Most of gold's radioisotopes with atomic masses below 197 decay by some combination of proton emission, α decay, and β^{+} decay. The exceptions are ^{195}Au, which decays by electron capture, and ^{196}Au, which decays most often by electron capture (93%) with a minor β^{−} decay path (7%). All of gold's radioisotopes with atomic masses above 197 decay by β^{−} decay.

At least 32 nuclear isomers have also been characterized, ranging in atomic mass from 170 to 200. Within that range, only ^{178}Au, ^{180}Au, ^{181}Au, ^{182}Au, and ^{188}Au do not have isomers. Gold's most stable isomer is ^{198m2}Au with a half-life of 2.27 days. Gold's least stable isomer is ^{177m2}Au with a half-life of only 7 ns. ^{184m1}Au has three decay paths: β^{+} decay, isomeric transition, and alpha decay. No other isomer or isotope of gold has three decay paths.

==== Synthesis ====
The possible production of gold from a more common element, such as lead, has long been a subject of human inquiry, and the ancient and medieval discipline of alchemy often focused on it; however, the transmutation of the chemical elements did not become possible until the understanding of nuclear physics in the 20th century. The first synthesis of gold was conducted by Japanese physicist Hantaro Nagaoka, who synthesized gold from mercury in 1924 by neutron bombardment. An American team, working without knowledge of Nagaoka's prior study, conducted the same experiment in 1941, achieving the same result and showing that the isotopes of gold produced by it were all radioactive. In 1980, Glenn Seaborg transmuted several thousand atoms of bismuth into gold at the Lawrence Berkeley Laboratory. Gold can be manufactured in a nuclear reactor, but doing so is highly impractical and would cost far more than the value of the gold that is produced.

== Chemistry ==
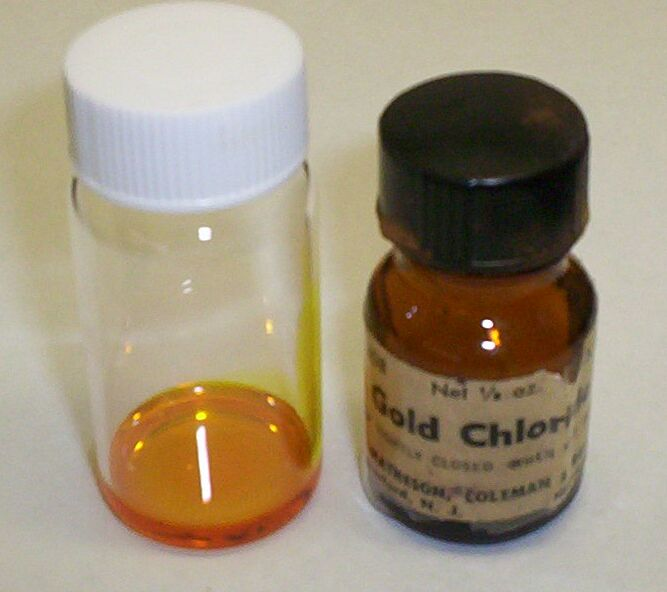
Gold(III) chloride solution in water

Although gold is the most noble of the noble metals, it still forms many diverse compounds. The oxidation state of gold in its compounds ranges from −1 to +5, but Au(I) and Au(III) dominate its chemistry. Au(I), referred to as the aurous ion, is the most common oxidation state with soft ligands such as thioethers, thiolates, and organophosphines. Au(I) compounds are typically linear. A good example is Au(CN)_{2}^{−}, which is the soluble form of gold encountered in mining. The binary gold halides, such as AuCl, form zigzag polymeric chains, again featuring linear coordination at Au. Most drugs based on gold are Au(I) derivatives.

Au(III) (referred to as auric) is a common oxidation state, and is illustrated by gold(III) chloride, Au_{2}Cl_{6}. The gold atom centers in Au(III) complexes, like other d^{8} compounds, are typically square planar, with chemical bonds that have both covalent and ionic character. Gold(I,III) chloride is also known, an example of a mixed-valence complex.

Gold does not react with oxygen at any temperature and, up to 100 °C, is resistant to attack from ozone:

Au + O_{2} → (no reaction)
Au + O_{3} (no reaction)

Some free halogens react to form the corresponding gold halides. Gold is strongly attacked by fluorine at dull-red heat to form gold(III) fluoride AuF_{3}. Powdered gold reacts with chlorine at 180 °C to form gold(III) chloride AuCl_{3}. Gold reacts with bromine at 140 °C to form a combination of gold(III) bromide AuBr_{3} and gold(I) bromide AuBr, but reacts very slowly with iodine to form gold(I) iodide AuI:

2 Au + 3 F_{2} 2 AuF_{3}
2 Au + 3 Cl_{2} 2 AuCl_{3}
2 Au + 2 Br_{2} AuBr_{3} + AuBr
2 Au + I_{2} 2 AuI

Gold does not react with sulfur directly, but gold(III) sulfide can be made by passing hydrogen sulfide through a dilute solution of gold(III) chloride or chlorauric acid.

Unlike sulfur, phosphorus reacts directly with gold at elevated temperatures to produce gold phosphide (Au_{2}P_{3}).

Gold readily dissolves in mercury at room temperature to form an amalgam, and forms alloys with many other metals at higher temperatures. These alloys can be produced to modify the hardness and other metallurgical properties, to control melting point or to create exotic colors.

Gold is unaffected by most acids. It does not react with hydrofluoric, hydrochloric, hydrobromic, hydriodic, sulfuric, or nitric acid. It does react with selenic acid:

2 Au + 6 H_{2}SeO_{4} Au_{2}(SeO_{4})_{3} + 3 H_{2}SeO_{3} + 3 H_{2}O

Gold is dissolved by aqua regia, a 1:3 mixture of nitric acid and hydrochloric acid. Nitric acid oxidizes the metal to +3 ions, but only in minute amounts, typically undetectable in the pure acid because of the chemical equilibrium of the reaction. However, the ions are removed from the equilibrium by hydrochloric acid, forming AuCl_{4}^{−} ions, or chloroauric acid, thereby enabling further oxidation:

Au + 4 HCl + HNO_{3} → HAuCl_{4} + NO↑ + 2 H_{2}O

Gold is similarly unaffected by most bases. It does not react with aqueous, solid, or molten sodium or potassium hydroxide. It does, however, react with sodium or potassium cyanide under alkaline conditions when oxygen is present to form soluble complexes.

Common oxidation states of gold include +1 (gold(I) or aurous compounds) and +3 (gold(III) or auric compounds). Gold ions in solution are readily reduced and precipitated as metal by adding any other metal as the reducing agent. The added metal is oxidized and dissolves, allowing the gold to be displaced from solution and be recovered as a solid precipitate.

=== Rare oxidation states ===
Less common oxidation states of gold include −1, +2, and +5.

The −1 oxidation state occurs in aurides, compounds containing the Au^{−} anion. Caesium auride (CsAu), for example, crystallizes in the caesium chloride motif; rubidium, potassium, and tetramethylammonium aurides are also known. Gold has the highest electron affinity of any metal, at 222.8 kJ/mol, making Au^{−} a stable species, analogous to the halides.

Gold also has a –1 oxidation state in covalent complexes with the group 4 transition metals, such as in titanium tetraauride and the analogous zirconium and hafnium compounds. These chemicals are expected to form gold-bridged dimers in a manner similar to titanium(IV) hydride.

Gold(II) compounds are usually diamagnetic with Au–Au bonds such as [Au(CH_{2})_{2}P(C_{6}H_{5})_{2}]_{2}Cl_{2}. The evaporation of a solution of Au(OH)_{3} in concentrated H_{2}SO_{4} produces red crystals of gold(II) sulfate, Au_{2}(SO_{4})_{2}. Originally thought to be a mixed-valence compound, it has been shown to contain Au_{2}^{4+} cations, analogous to the better-known mercury(I) ion, Hg_{2}^{2+}. A gold(II) complex, the tetraxenonogold(II) cation, which contains xenon as a ligand, occurs in [AuXe_{4}](Sb_{2}F_{11})_{2}. In September 2023, a novel type of metal-halide perovskite material consisting of Au^{3+} and Au^{2+} cations in its crystal structure has been found. It has been shown to be unexpectedly stable at normal conditions.

Gold pentafluoride, along with its derivative anion, AuF_{6}^{−}, and its difluorine complex, gold heptafluoride, is the sole example of gold(V), the highest verified oxidation state.

Some gold compounds exhibit aurophilic bonding, which describes the tendency of gold ions to interact at distances that are too long to be a conventional Au–Au bond but shorter than van der Waals bonding. The interaction is estimated to be comparable in strength to that of a hydrogen bond.

Well-defined cluster compounds are numerous. In some cases, gold has a fractional oxidation state. A representative example is the octahedral species {Au(P(C_{6}H_{5})_{3})}_{6}^{2+}.

== Origin ==
=== Gold production in the universe ===
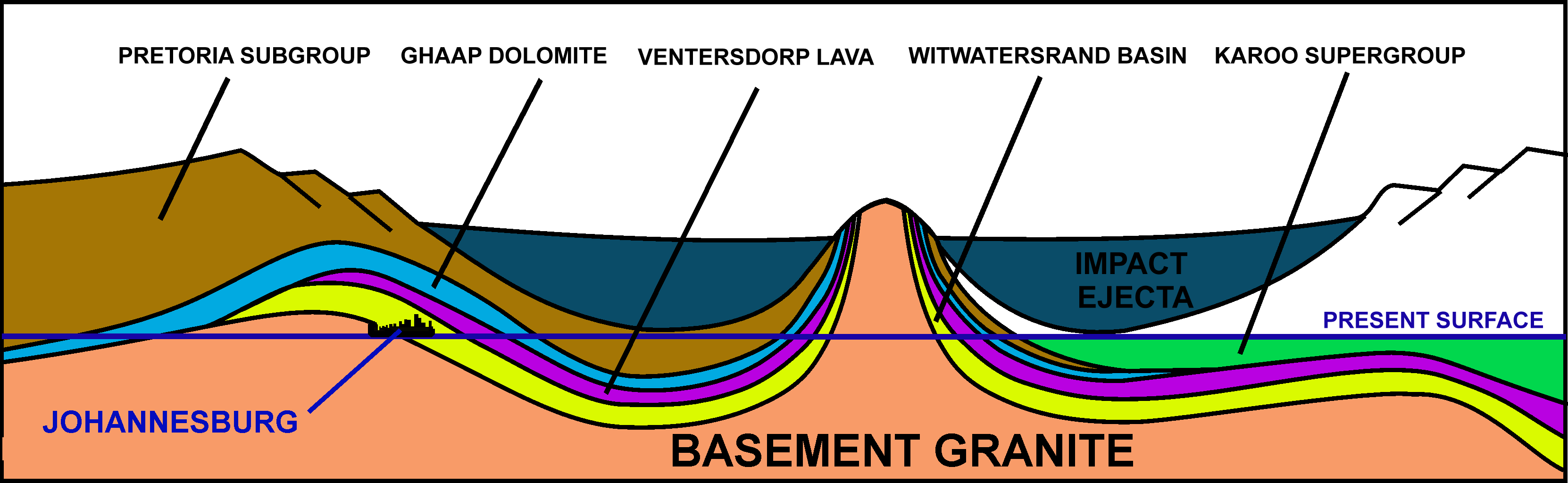
Schematic of a NE (left) to SW (right) cross-section through the 2.020-billion-year-old Vredefort impact structure in South Africa and how it distorted the contemporary geological structures. The present erosion level is shown. Johannesburg is located where the Witwatersrand Basin (the yellow layer) is exposed at the "present surface" line, just inside the crater rim, on the left. Not to scale.

Gold in the universe is produced through several cosmic processes and was present in the dust from which the Solar System formed. Scientists have identified three main cosmic sources for gold formation: supernova nucleosynthesis, neutron star collisions, and magnetar flares.

All three sources involve a process called the r-process (rapid neutron capture), which forms elements heavier than iron. For decades, scientists believed supernova nucleosynthesis was the primary mechanism for gold formation. More recently, research has shown that neutron star collisions produce significant quantities of gold through the r-process.

In August 2017, the spectroscopic signatures of heavy elements, including gold, were directly observed by electromagnetic observatories during the GW170817 neutron star merger event. This confirmed neutron star mergers as a source of gold, after years of only indirect detection. This single event generated between 3 and 13 Earth masses of gold, suggesting that neutron star mergers might produce enough gold to account for most of this element in the universe.

However, neutron star mergers alone cannot explain all cosmic gold, particularly in older stars, because these mergers occur relatively late in galactic history and are infrequent (approximately once every 100,000 years). This created a timing paradox in explaining the presence of gold in stars formed early in the universe.

In 2025, researchers resolved this paradox by confirming that giant flares from magnetars (highly magnetic neutron stars) are also a significant source of gold formation. Analysis of a 2004 magnetar flare showed these events produce heavy elements through the same r-process as neutron star mergers. The amount of heavy elements created in a single magnetar flare can exceed the mass of Mars. Since magnetars existed earlier in cosmic history and flare more frequently than neutron star mergers occur, they help explain gold's presence in older stars. Scientists estimate magnetar flares may contribute approximately 1–10% of all elements heavier than iron in our galaxy, including gold.

=== Asteroid origin theories ===
Because the Earth was molten when it was formed, almost all of the gold present in the early Earth probably sank into the planetary core. Therefore, as hypothesized in one model, most of the gold in the Earth's crust and mantle is thought to have been delivered to Earth by asteroid impacts during the Late Heavy Bombardment, about 4 billion years ago.

Gold which is reachable by humans has, in one case, been associated with a particular asteroid impact. The asteroid that formed Vredefort impact structure 2.020 billion years ago is often credited with seeding the Witwatersrand basin in South Africa with the richest gold deposits on earth. However, this scenario is now questioned. The gold-bearing Witwatersrand rocks were laid down between 700 and 950 million years before the Vredefort impact. These gold-bearing rocks had furthermore been covered by a thick layer of Ventersdorp lavas and the Transvaal Supergroup of rocks before the meteor struck, and thus the gold did not actually arrive in the asteroid/meteorite. What the Vredefort impact achieved, however, was to distort the Witwatersrand basin in such a way that the gold-bearing rocks were brought to the present erosion surface in Johannesburg, on the Witwatersrand, just inside the rim of the original 300 km (190 mi) diameter crater caused by the meteor strike. The discovery of the deposit in 1886 launched the Witwatersrand Gold Rush. Some 22% of all the gold that is ascertained to exist today on Earth has been extracted from these Witwatersrand rocks.

=== Mantle return theories ===
Much of the rest of the gold on Earth is thought to have been incorporated into the planet since its very beginning, as planetesimals formed the mantle. In 2017, an international group of scientists established that gold "came to the Earth's surface from the deepest regions of our planet", the mantle, as evidenced by their findings at Deseado Massif in the Argentinian Patagonia.

== Occurrence ==
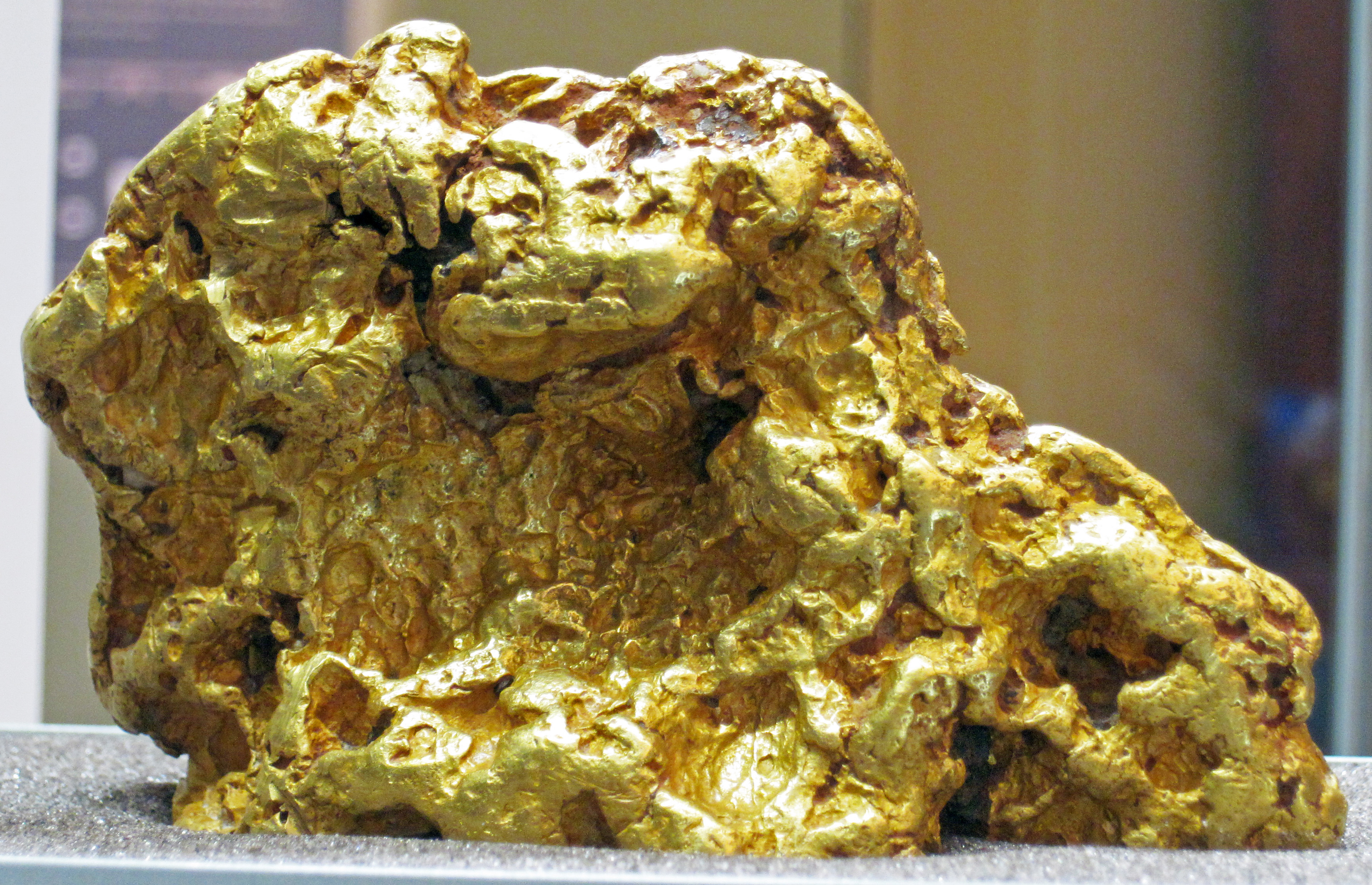
Native gold

On Earth, gold is found in ores in rock formed from the Precambrian time onward. It most often occurs as a native metal, typically in a metal solid solution with silver (i.e. as a gold/silver alloy). Such alloys usually have a silver content of 8–10%. Electrum is elemental gold with more than 20% silver, and is commonly known as white gold. Electrum's color runs from golden-silvery to silvery, dependent upon the silver content. The more silver, the lower the specific gravity.

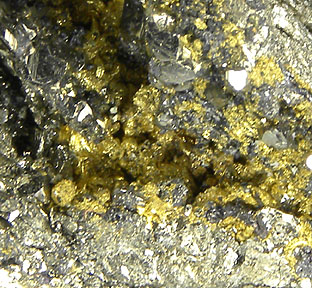
Gold in pyrite

Native gold occurs as very small to microscopic particles embedded in rock, often together with quartz or sulfide minerals such as "fool's gold", which is a pyrite. These are called lode deposits. The metal in a native state is also found in the form of free flakes, grains or larger nuggets that have been eroded from rocks and end up in alluvial deposits called placer deposits. Such free gold is always richer at the exposed surface of gold-bearing veins, owing to the oxidation of accompanying minerals followed by weathering; and by washing of the dust into streams and rivers, where it collects and can be welded by water action to form nuggets.

Gold sometimes occurs combined with tellurium as the minerals calaverite, krennerite, nagyagite, petzite and sylvanite (see telluride minerals), and as the rare bismuthide maldonite (Au_{2}Bi) and antimonide aurostibite (AuSb_{2}). Gold also occurs in rare alloys with copper, lead, and mercury: the minerals auricupride (Cu_{3}Au), novodneprite (AuPb_{3}) and weishanite ((Au,Ag)_{3}Hg_{2}).

A 2004 research paper suggests that microbes can sometimes play an important role in forming gold deposits, transporting and precipitating gold to form grains and nuggets that collect in alluvial deposits.

A 2013 study has claimed water in faults vaporizes during an earthquake, depositing gold. When an earthquake strikes, it moves along a fault. Water often lubricates faults, filling in fractures and jogs. About 10 kilometers (6.2 mi) below the surface, under very high temperatures and pressures, the water carries high concentrations of carbon dioxide, silica, and gold. During an earthquake, the fault jog suddenly opens wider. The water inside the void instantly vaporizes, flashing to steam and forcing silica, which forms the mineral quartz, and gold out of the fluids and onto nearby surfaces.

Gold can be found in M-type asteroids.

=== Seawater ===
The world's oceans contain gold. Measured concentrations of gold in the Atlantic and Northeast Pacific are 50–150 femtomol/L or 10–30 parts per quadrillion (about 10–30 g/km^{3}). In general, gold concentrations for south Atlantic and central Pacific samples are the same (~50 femtomol/L) but less certain. Mediterranean deep waters contain slightly higher concentrations of gold (100–150 femtomol/L), which is attributed to wind-blown dust or rivers. At 10 parts per quadrillion, the Earth's oceans would hold 15,000 tonnes of gold. These figures are three orders of magnitude less than reported in the literature prior to 1988, indicating contamination problems with the earlier data.

A number of people have claimed to be able to economically recover gold from sea water, but they were either mistaken or acted in an intentional deception. Prescott Jernegan ran a gold-from-seawater swindle in the United States in the 1890s, as did an English fraudster in the early 1900s. Fritz Haber did research on the extraction of gold from sea water in an effort to help pay Germany's reparations following World War I. Based on the published values of 2 to 64 ppb of gold in seawater, a commercially successful extraction seemed possible. After analysis of 4,000 water samples yielding an average of 0.004 ppb, it became clear that extraction would not be possible, and he ended the project.

== History ==
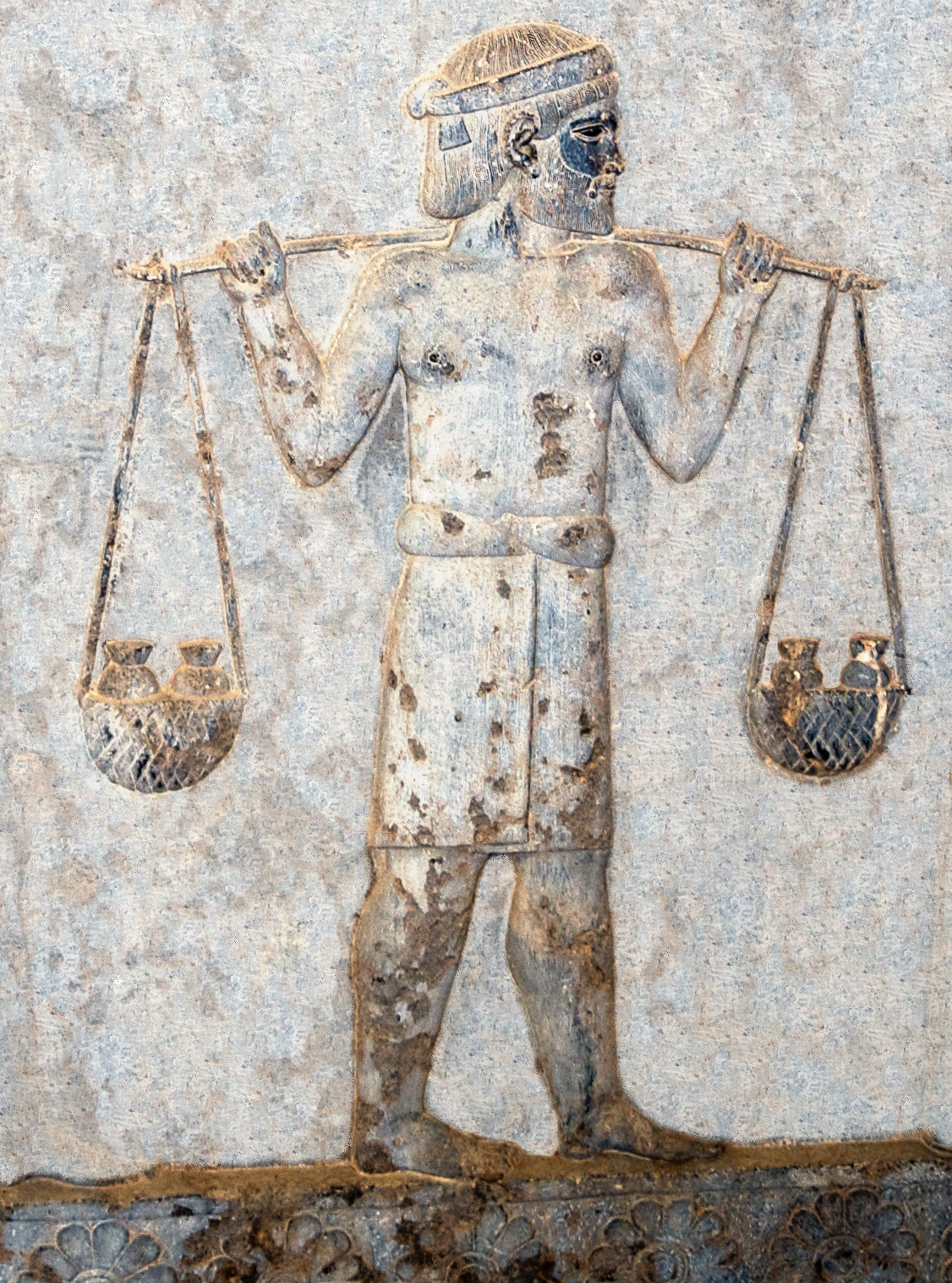
An Indian tribute-bearer at Apadana, from the Achaemenid satrapy of Hindush, carrying gold on a yoke, circa 500 BC.

The earliest recorded metal employed by humans appears to be gold. Small amounts of natural gold have been found in Spanish caves used during the late Paleolithic period, c. 40,000 BC.

The oldest gold artifacts in the world are from Bulgaria and are dating back to the 5th millennium BC, such as those found in the Varna Necropolis near Lake Varna and the Black Sea coast, thought to be the earliest "well-dated" finding of gold artifacts in history.

Gold artifacts probably made their appearance in Ancient Egypt at the beginning of the pre-dynastic period, at the end of the fifth millennium BC and the start of the fourth, and smelting was developed during the course of the 4th millennium; gold artifacts appear in the archeology of Lower Mesopotamia during the early 4th millennium. As of 1990, gold artifacts found at the Wadi Qana cave cemetery of the 4th millennium BC in West Bank were the earliest from the Levant. Gold artifacts such as the golden hats and the Nebra disk appeared in Central Europe from the 2nd millennium BC Bronze Age.

Exploitation of gold in the south-east corner of the Black Sea is said to date from the time of Midas, and this gold was important in the establishment of what is probably the world's earliest coinage in Lydia around 610 BC.

During Mansa Musa's (ruler of the Mali Empire from 1312 to 1337) hajj to Mecca in 1324, he passed through Cairo in July 1324, and was reportedly accompanied by a camel train that included thousands of people and nearly a hundred camels where he gave away so much gold that it depressed the price in Egypt for over a decade, causing high inflation.

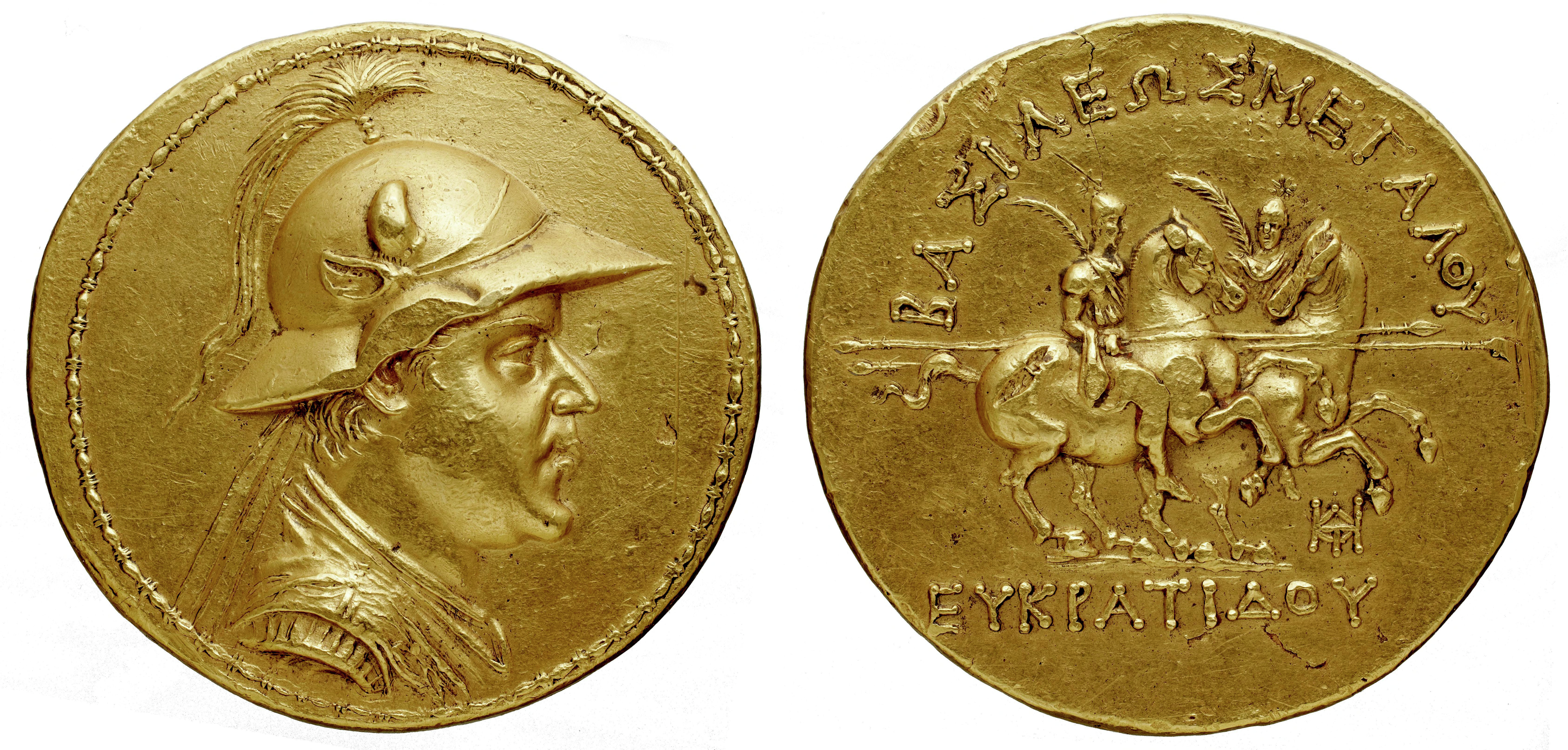
Gold coin of Eucratides I (171–145 BC), one of the Hellenistic rulers of ancient Ai-Khanoum. This is the largest known gold coin minted in antiquity (169.2 g (5.97 oz); 58 mm (2.3 in)).

The European exploration of the Americas was fueled in no small part by reports of the gold ornaments displayed in great profusion by Native American peoples, especially in Mesoamerica, Peru, Ecuador and Colombia. The Aztecs regarded gold as the product of the gods, calling it literally "god excrement" (teocuitlatl in Nahuatl), and after Moctezuma II was killed, most of this gold was shipped to Spain. However, for the indigenous peoples of North America gold was considered useless and they saw much greater value in other minerals which were directly related to their utility, such as obsidian, flint, and slate.

Beginning in the early modern period, European exploration and colonization of West Africa was driven in large part by reports of gold deposits in the region, which was eventually referred to by Europeans as the "Gold Coast". From the late 15th to early 19th centuries, European trade in the region was primarily focused in gold, along with ivory and slaves. The gold trade in West Africa was dominated by the Ashanti Empire, who initially traded with the Portuguese before branching out and trading with British, French, Spanish and Danish merchants. British desires to secure control of West African gold deposits played a role in the Anglo-Ashanti wars of the late 19th century, which saw the Ashanti Empire annexed by Britain.

One main goal of the alchemists was to produce gold from other substances, such as lead — presumably by the interaction with a mythical substance called the philosopher's stone. Trying to produce gold led the alchemists to systematically find out what can be done with substances, and this laid the foundation for today's chemistry, which can produce gold (albeit uneconomically) by using nuclear transmutation.

== Production ==
Gold production

Time trend of gold production

According to the United States Geological Survey in 2016, about 5,726,000,000 troy ounces (178,100 t) of gold has been accounted for, of which 85% remains in active use.

=== Mining and prospecting ===
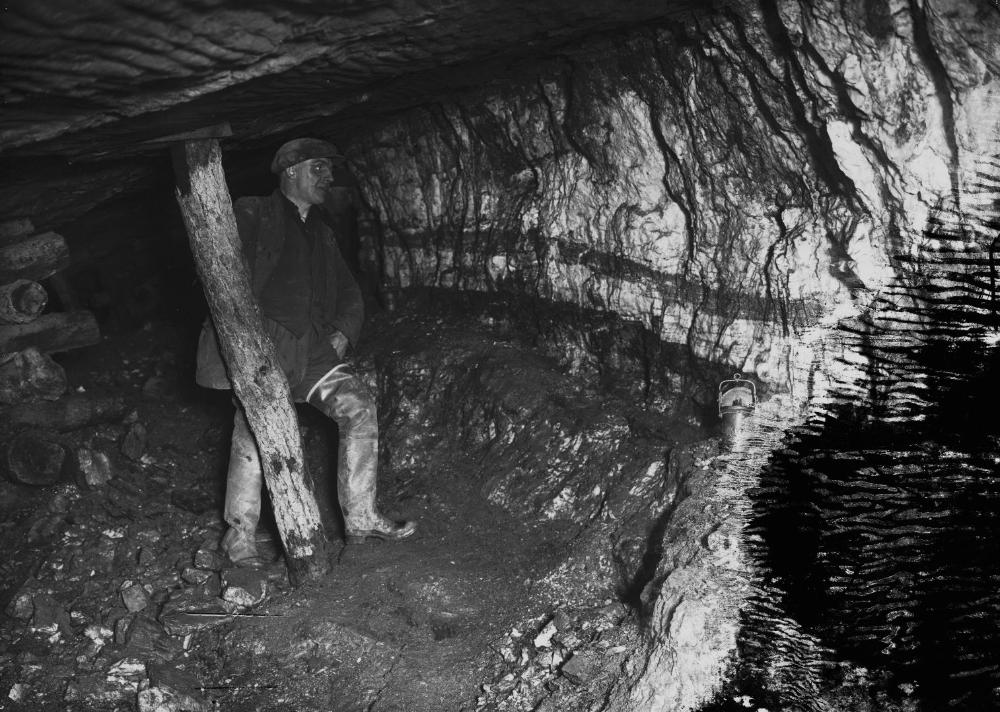
A miner underground at Pumsaint gold mine, Wales; c. 1938.

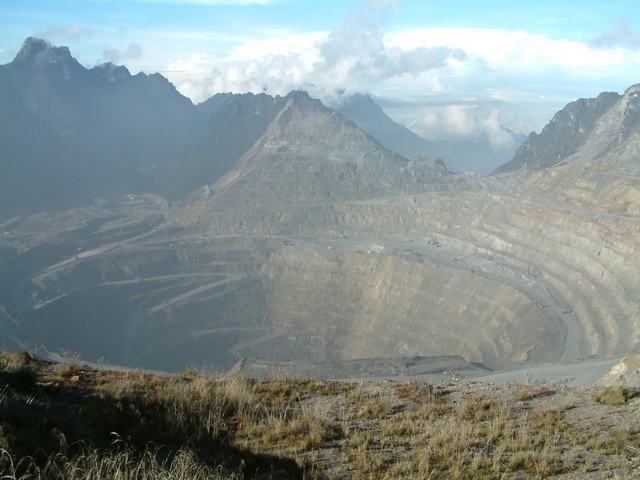
Grasberg mine, in Indonesia, is the world's largest gold mine.

Since the 1880s, South Africa has been the source of a large proportion of the world's gold supply, and about 22% of the gold presently accounted for is from South Africa. Production in 1970 accounted for 79% of the world supply, about 1,480 tonnes. In 2007, China (with 276 tonnes) overtook South Africa as the world's largest gold producer, the first time since 1905 that South Africa had not been the largest.

In 2025, China was the world's leading gold-mining country, producing 380 metric tons of gold, followed by Russia (310 tons), Australia (280 tons), Canada (200 tons), the United States (160 tons), and Ghana (150 tons).

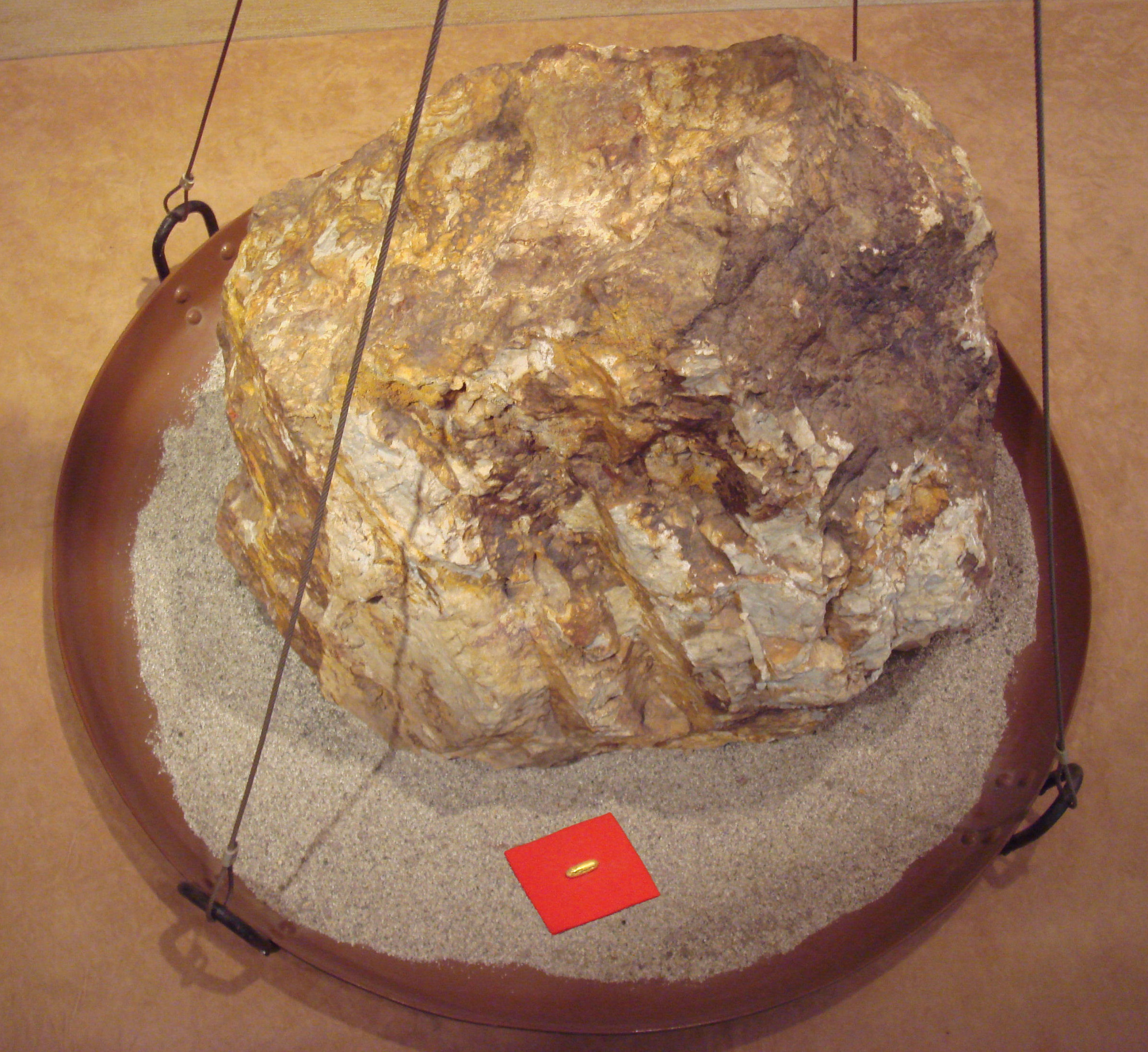
Relative sizes of an 860 kg (1,900 lb) block of gold ore and the 30 g (0.96 ozt) of gold that can be extracted from it, Toi gold mine, Japan.

In South America, the controversial project Pascua Lama aims at exploitation of rich fields in the high mountains of Atacama Desert, at the border between Chile and Argentina.

It has been estimated that up to one-quarter of the yearly global gold production originates from artisanal or small scale mining.

The city of Johannesburg located in South Africa was founded as a result of the Witwatersrand Gold Rush which resulted in the discovery of some of the largest natural gold deposits in recorded history. The gold fields are confined to the northern and north-western edges of the Witwatersrand basin, which is a 5–7 km (3.1–4.3 mi) thick layer of archean rocks located, in most places, deep under the Free State, Gauteng and surrounding provinces. These Witwatersrand rocks are exposed at the surface on the Witwatersrand, in and around Johannesburg, but also in isolated patches to the south-east and south-west of Johannesburg, as well as in an arc around the Vredefort Dome which lies close to the center of the Witwatersrand basin. From these surface exposures the basin dips extensively, requiring some of the mining to occur at depths of nearly 4,000 m (13,000 ft), making them, especially the Savuka and TauTona mines to the south-west of Johannesburg, the deepest mines on Earth. The gold is found only in six areas where archean rivers from the north and north-west formed extensive pebbly Braided river deltas before draining into the "Witwatersrand sea" where the rest of the Witwatersrand sediments were deposited.

The Second Boer War of 1899–1901 between the British Empire and the Afrikaner Boers was at least partly over the rights of miners and possession of the gold wealth in South Africa.

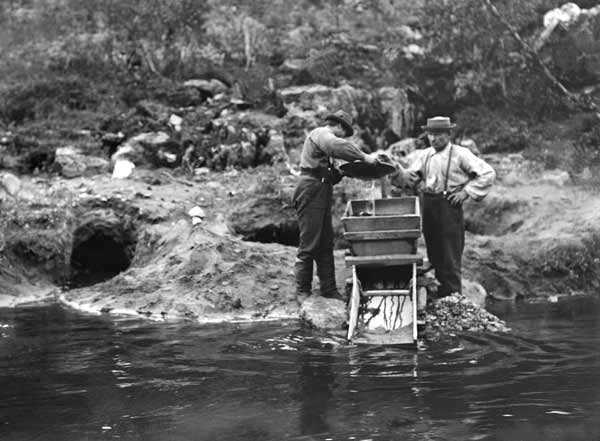
Gold prospecting at the Ivalo River in the Finnish Lapland in 1898

During the 19th century, gold rushes occurred whenever large gold deposits were discovered. The first documented discovery of gold in the United States was at the Reed Gold Mine near Georgeville, North Carolina in 1803. The first major gold strike in the United States occurred in a small north Georgia town called Dahlonega. Further gold rushes occurred in California, Colorado, the Black Hills, Otago in New Zealand, a number of locations across Australia, Witwatersrand in South Africa, and the Klondike in Canada.

Grasberg mine located in Papua, Indonesia is the largest gold mine in the world.

=== Extraction and refining ===
Gold extraction is most economical in large, easily mined deposits. Ore grades as little as 0.5 parts per million (ppm) can be economical. Typical ore grades in open-pit mines are 1–5 ppm; ore grades in underground or hard rock mines are usually at least 3 ppm. Because ore grades of 30 ppm are usually needed before gold is visible to the naked eye, in most gold mines the gold is invisible.

The average gold mining and extraction costs were about $317 per troy ounce in 2007 (equivalent to $492 in 2025), but these can vary widely depending on mining type and ore quality; global mine production amounted to 2,471.1 tonnes.

After initial production, gold is often subsequently refined industrially by the Wohlwill process which is based on electrolysis or by the Miller process, that is chlorination in the melt. The Wohlwill process results in higher purity, but is more complex and is only applied in small-scale installations. Other methods of assaying and purifying smaller amounts of gold include parting and inquartation as well as cupellation, or refining methods based on the dissolution of gold in aqua regia.

=== Recycling ===
In 1997, recycled gold accounted for approximately 20% of the 2700 tons of gold supplied to the market. Jewelry companies such as Generation Collection and computer companies including Dell conduct recycling.

As of 2020, the amount of carbon dioxide CO_{2} produced in recycling a kilogram of gold produces 53 kilograms of CO_{2} equivalent, while mining a kilogram of gold produces 16 tonnes. Recycling gold is about 300 times more efficient than mining. Approximately 30 percent of the global gold supply is recycled and not mined as of 2020.

Gold jewelry consumption by country (in tonnes)
Country	2009	2010	2011	2012	2013
India	442.37	745.70	986.3	864	974
China	376.96	428.00	921.5	817.5	1120.1
United States	150.28	128.61	199.5	161	190
Turkey	75.16	74.07	143	118	175.2
Saudi Arabia	77.75	72.95	69.1	58.5	72.2
Russia	60.12	67.50	76.7	81.9	73.3
United Arab Emirates	67.60	63.37	60.9	58.1	77.1
Egypt	56.68	53.43	36	47.8	57.3
Indonesia	41.00	32.75	55	52.3	68
United Kingdom	31.75	27.35	22.6	21.1	23.4
Other Persian Gulf Countries	24.10	21.97	22	19.9	24.6
Japan	21.85	18.50	−30.1	7.6	21.3
South Korea	18.83	15.87	15.5	12.1	17.5
Vietnam	15.08	14.36	100.8	77	92.2
Thailand	7.33	6.28	107.4	80.9	140.1
Total	1466.86	1770.71	2786.12	2477.7	3126.1
Other Countries	251.6	254.0	390.4	393.5	450.7
World Total	1718.46	2024.71	3176.52	2871.2	3576.8

=== Pollution ===
Gold production is associated with contribution to hazardous pollution.

Low-grade gold ore may contain less than one ppm gold metal; such ore is ground and mixed with sodium cyanide to dissolve the gold. Cyanide is a highly poisonous chemical, which can kill living creatures when exposed in minute quantities. Many cyanide spills from gold mines have occurred in both developed and developing countries which killed aquatic life in long stretches of affected rivers. Environmentalists consider these events major environmental disasters. Up to thirty tons of used ore can be dumped as waste for producing one troy ounce of gold. Gold ore dumps are the source of many heavy elements such as cadmium, lead, zinc, copper, arsenic, selenium and mercury. When sulfide-bearing minerals in these ore dumps are exposed to air and water, the sulfide transforms into sulfuric acid which in turn dissolves these heavy metals facilitating their passage into surface water and ground water. This process is called acid mine drainage. These gold ore dumps contain long-term, highly hazardous waste.

It was once common to use mercury to recover gold from ore, but today the use of mercury is largely limited to small-scale individual miners. Minute quantities of mercury compounds can reach water bodies, causing heavy metal contamination. Mercury can then enter into the human food chain in the form of methylmercury. Mercury poisoning in humans can cause severe brain damage.

Gold extraction is also a highly energy-intensive industry — extracting ore from deep mines and grinding the large quantity of ore for further chemical extraction requires nearly 25 kWh of electricity per gram of gold produced.

== Monetary use ==
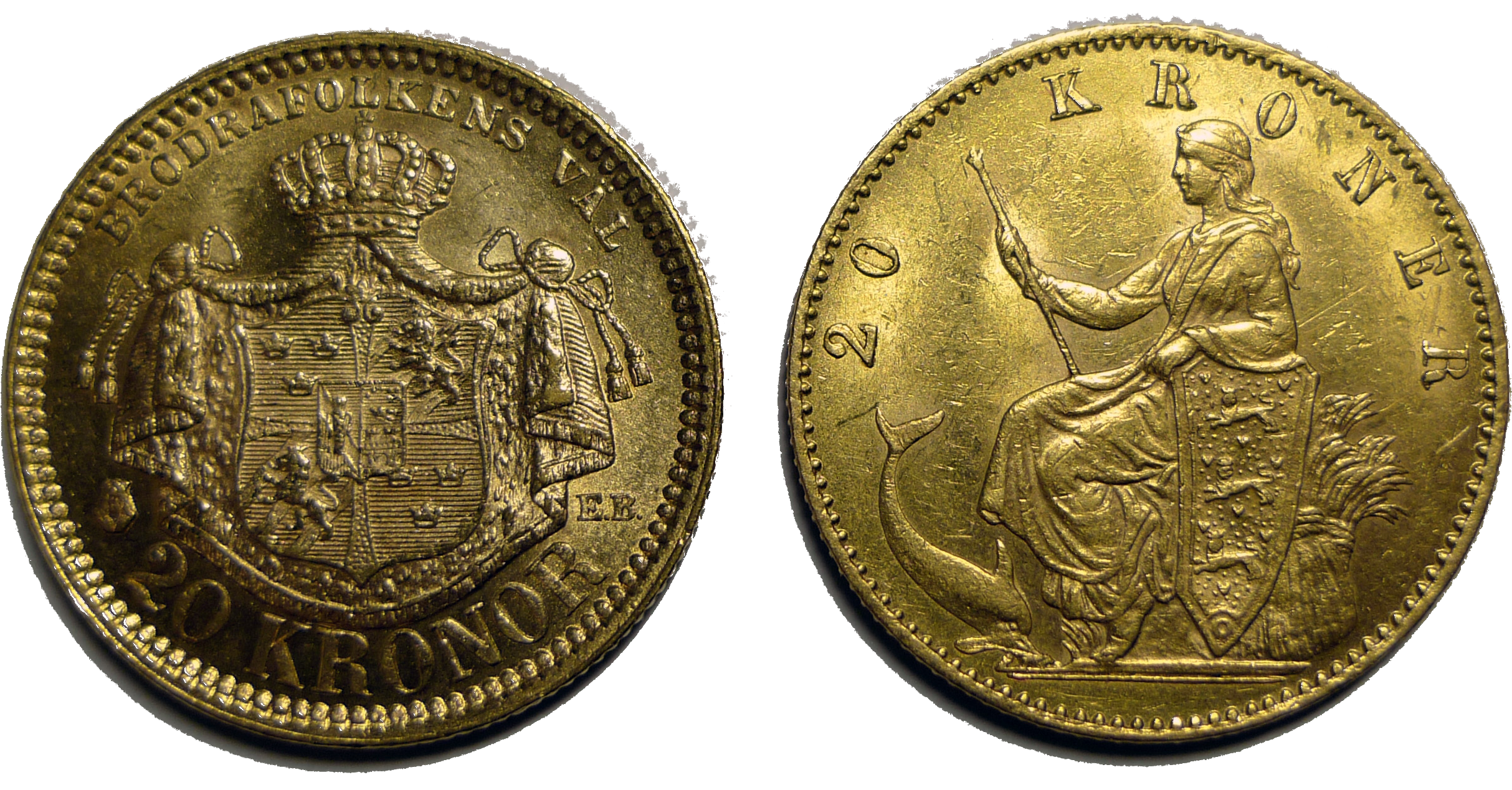
Two golden 20 kr coins from the Scandinavian Monetary Union, which was based on a gold standard. The coin to the left is Swedish and the right one is Danish.

Gold has been widely used throughout the world as money, for efficient indirect exchange (versus barter), and to store wealth in hoards. For exchange purposes, mints produce standardized gold bullion coins, bars and other units of fixed weight and purity.

The first known coins containing gold were struck in Lydia, Asia Minor, around 600 BC. The talent coin of gold in use during the periods of Grecian history both before and during the time of the life of Homer weighed between 8.42 and 8.75 grams. From an earlier preference in using silver, European economies re-established the minting of gold as coinage during the thirteenth and fourteenth centuries.

Bills (that mature into gold coin) and gold certificates (convertible into gold coin at the issuing bank) added to the circulating stock of gold standard money in most 19th century industrial economies. In preparation for World War I the warring nations moved to fractional gold standards, inflating their currencies to finance the war effort. Post-war, the victorious countries, most notably Britain, gradually restored gold-convertibility, but international flows of gold via bills of exchange remained embargoed; international shipments were made exclusively for bilateral trades or to pay war reparations.

After World War II gold was replaced by a system of nominally convertible currencies related by fixed exchange rates following the Bretton Woods system. Gold standards and the direct convertibility of currencies to gold have been abandoned by world governments, led in 1971 by the United States' refusal to redeem its dollars in gold. Fiat currency now fills most monetary roles. Switzerland was the last country to tie its currency to gold; this was ended by a referendum in 1999.

Central banks continue to keep a portion of their liquid reserves as gold in some form, and metals exchanges such as the London Bullion Market Association still clear transactions denominated in gold, including future delivery contracts. Today, gold mining output is declining. With the sharp growth of economies in the 20th century, and increasing foreign exchange, the world's gold reserves and their trading market have become a small fraction of all markets and fixed exchange rates of currencies to gold have been replaced by floating prices for gold and gold future contract. Though the gold stock grows by only 1% or 2% per year, very little metal is irretrievably consumed. Inventory above ground would satisfy many decades of industrial and even artisan uses at current prices.

The gold proportion (fineness) of alloys is measured by karat (k). Pure gold (commercially termed fine gold) is designated as 24 karat, abbreviated 24k. English gold coins intended for circulation from 1526 into the 1930s were typically a standard 22k alloy called crown gold, for hardness (American gold coins for circulation after 1837 contain an alloy of 0.900 fine gold, or 21.6 kt).

Often the prices of various platinum group metals can be much higher than gold, although gold has been used as a standard for currencies to a greater degree than the platinum group metals. Gold has been used as a symbol for purity, value, royalty, and particularly roles that combine these properties. Gold as a sign of wealth and prestige was ridiculed by Thomas More in his treatise Utopia. On that imaginary island, gold is so abundant that it is used to make chains for slaves, tableware, and lavatory seats. When ambassadors from other countries arrive, dressed in ostentatious gold jewels and badges, the Utopians mistake them for menial servants, paying homage instead to the most modestly dressed of their party.

The ISO 4217 currency code of gold is XAU. Many holders of gold store it in form of bullion coins or bars as a hedge against inflation or other economic disruptions. A paper by the National Bureau of Economic Research found that gold may be reliable as an inflation hedge over long timescales (centuries) but not over practical timescales. Modern bullion coins for investment or collector purposes do not require good mechanical wear properties; they are typically fine gold at 24k, although the American Gold Eagle and the British gold sovereign continue to be minted in 22k (0.92) metal in historical tradition, and the South African Krugerrand, first released in 1967, is also 22k (0.92).

The special issue Canadian Gold Maple Leaf coin contains the highest purity gold of any bullion coin, at 99.999% or 0.99999, while the popular issue Canadian Gold Maple Leaf coin has a purity of 99.99%. In 2006, the United States Mint began producing the American Buffalo gold bullion coin with a purity of 99.99%. The Australian Gold Kangaroos were first coined in 1986 as the Australian Gold Nugget but changed the reverse design in 1989. Other modern coins include the Austrian Vienna Philharmonic bullion coin and the Chinese Gold Panda.

=== Price ===
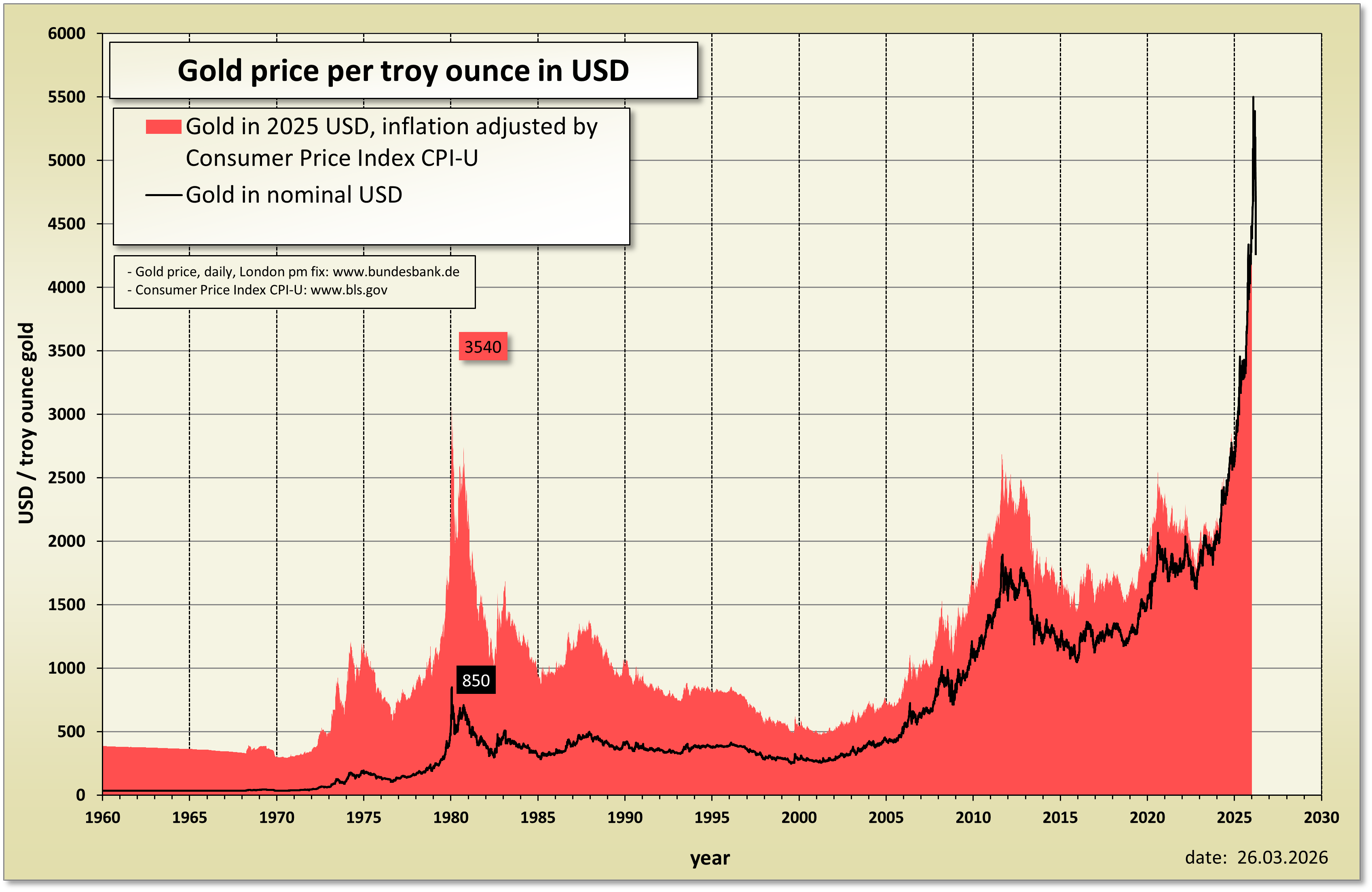
Gold price history in 1960–present.

Like other precious metals, gold is measured by troy weight and by grams. The proportion of gold in the alloy is measured by karat (k), with 24 karat (24k) being pure gold (100%), and lower karat numbers proportionally less (18k = 75%). The purity of a gold bar or coin can also be expressed as a decimal figure ranging from 0 to 1, known as the millesimal fineness, such as 0.995 being nearly pure.

The price of gold is determined through trading in the gold and derivatives markets, but a procedure known as the Gold Fixing in London, originating in September 1919, provides a daily benchmark price to the industry. The afternoon fixing was introduced in 1968 to provide a price when US markets are open.

== Other applications ==
=== Jewelry ===
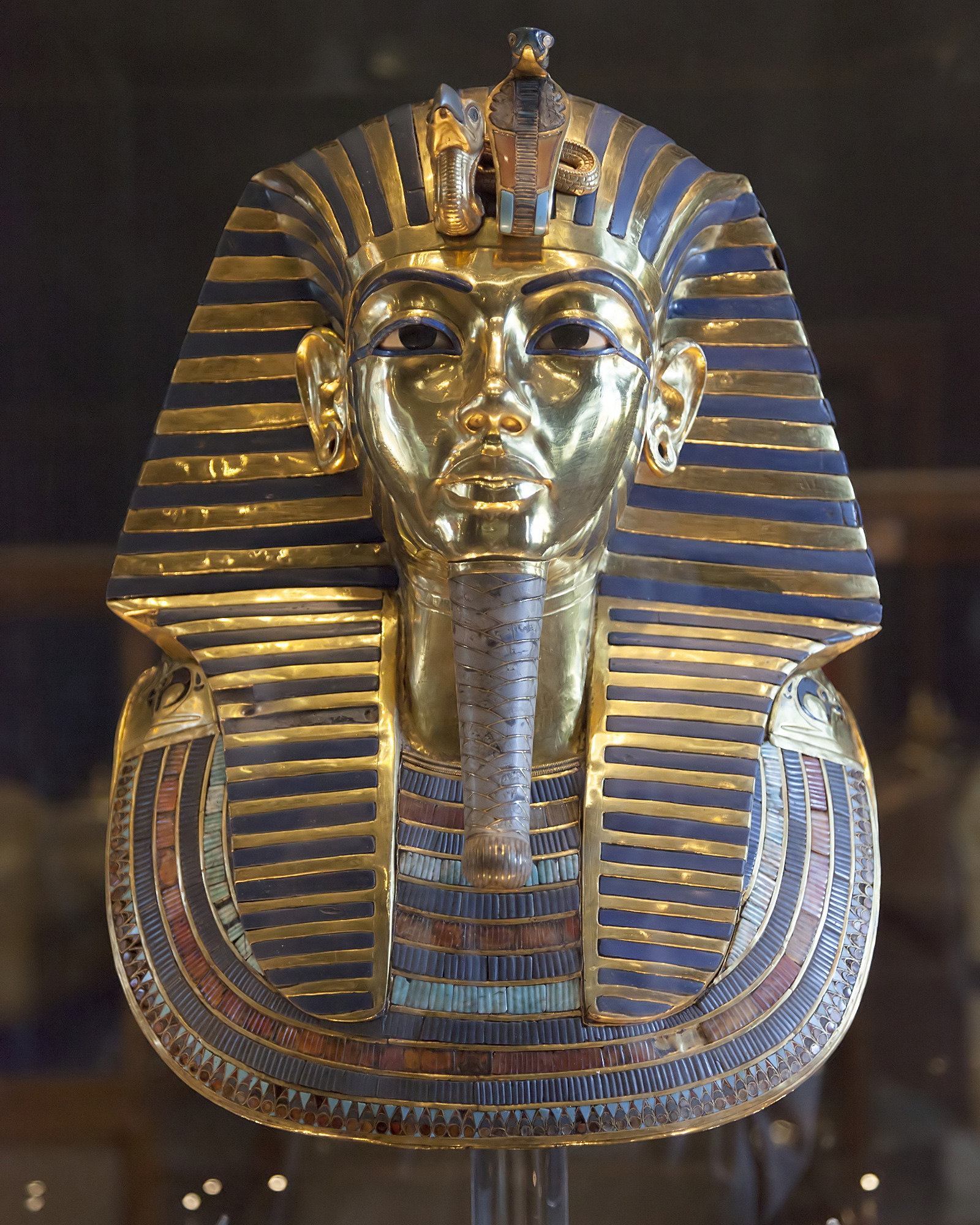
Tutankhamun's gold funerary mask at the Egyptian Museum in Cairo, Egypt in 2016

Pure (24k) gold is often alloyed with other metals for use in jewelry, altering its hardness and ductility, melting point, color and other properties. Alloys with lower karat rating, typically 22k, 18k, 14k or 10k, contain higher percentages of copper, silver, or other base metals in the alloy. Nickel is toxic, and its release from nickel white gold is controlled by legislation in Europe. Palladium-gold alloys are more expensive than those using nickel. High-karat white gold alloys are more resistant to corrosion than are either pure silver or sterling silver, though not as corrosion-proof as platinum jewelry. The Japanese craft of Mokume-gane exploits the color contrasts between laminated colored gold alloys to produce decorative wood-grain effects.

Gold solder is used for joining the components of gold jewelry by high-temperature hard soldering or brazing. If the work is to be of hallmarking quality, the gold solder alloy must match the fineness of the work, and alloy formulas are manufactured to color-match yellow and white gold. Gold solder is usually made in at least three melting-point ranges referred to as Easy, Medium and Hard. By using the hard, high-melting point solder first, followed by solders with progressively lower melting points, goldsmiths can assemble complex items with several separate soldered joints. Gold can also be made into thread and used in embroidery.

=== Electronics ===
Only 10% of the world consumption of new gold produced goes to industry, but by far the most important industrial use for new gold is in fabrication of corrosion-free electrical connectors in computers and other electrical devices. For example, according to the World Gold Council, a typical cell phone may contain 50 mg of gold, worth about three dollars. But since nearly one billion cell phones are produced each year, a gold value of US$2.82 (equivalent to $3 in 2025) in each phone adds to US$2.82 billion in gold from just this application (equivalent to $3.102513077×10^{9} in 2025).

Though gold is attacked by free chlorine, its good conductivity and general resistance to oxidation and corrosion in other environments (including resistance to non-chlorinated acids) has led to its widespread industrial use in the electronic era as a thin-layer coating on electrical connectors, thereby ensuring good connection. For example, gold is used in the connectors of the more expensive electronics cables, such as audio, video and USB cables. The benefit of using gold over other connector metals such as tin in these applications has been debated; gold connectors are often criticized by audio-visual experts as unnecessary for most consumers and seen as simply a marketing ploy. However, the use of gold in other applications in electronic sliding contacts in highly humid or corrosive atmospheres, and in use for contacts with a very high failure cost (certain computers, communications equipment, spacecraft, jet aircraft engines) remains very common.

Besides sliding electrical contacts, gold is also used in electrical contacts because of its resistance to corrosion, electrical conductivity, ductility and lack of toxicity. Switch contacts are generally subjected to more intense corrosion stress than are sliding contacts. Fine gold wires are used to connect semiconductor devices to their packages through a process known as wire bonding.

The concentration of free electrons in gold metal is 5.91×10^{22} cm^{−3}. Gold is highly conductive to electricity and has been used for electrical wiring in some high-energy applications (only silver and copper are more conductive per volume, but gold is the only of these three with zero corrosion). For example, gold electrical wires were used during some of the Manhattan Project's atomic experiments, but large high-current silver wires were used in the calutron isotope separator magnets in the project.

It is estimated that 16% of the world's presently-accounted-for gold and 22% of the world's silver is contained in electronic technology in Japan.

=== Medicine ===
There are only two gold compounds currently employed as pharmaceuticals in modern medicine (sodium aurothiomalate and auranofin), used in the treatment of arthritis and other similar conditions in the US due to their anti-inflammatory properties. These drugs have been explored as a means to help to reduce the pain and swelling of rheumatoid arthritis, and also (historically) against tuberculosis and some parasites.

Historically, metallic and gold compounds have long been used for medicinal purposes. Gold, usually as the metal, is perhaps the most anciently administered medicine (apparently by shamanic practitioners) and known to Dioscorides. In medieval times, gold was often seen as beneficial for the health, in the belief that something so rare and beautiful could not be anything but healthy.

In the 19th century gold had a reputation as an anxiolytic, a therapy for nervous disorders. Depression, epilepsy, migraine, and glandular problems such as amenorrhea and impotence were treated, and most notably alcoholism (Keeley, 1897).

The apparent paradox of the actual toxicology of the substance suggests the possibility of serious gaps in the understanding of the action of gold in physiology. Only salts and radioisotopes of gold are of pharmacological value, since elemental (metallic) gold is inert to all chemicals it encounters inside the body (e.g., ingested gold cannot be attacked by stomach acid).

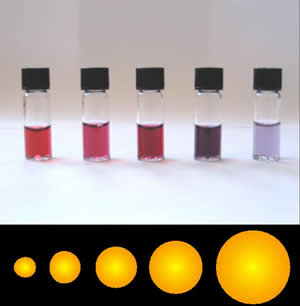
Colloidal gold varies in color with the size of gold particles

Gold alloys are used in restorative dentistry, especially in tooth restorations, such as crowns and permanent bridges. The gold alloys' slight malleability facilitates the creation of a superior molar mating surface with other teeth and produces results that are generally more satisfactory than those produced by the creation of porcelain crowns. The use of gold crowns in more prominent teeth such as incisors is favored in some cultures and discouraged in others.

Colloidal gold preparations (suspensions of gold nanoparticles) in water are intensely red-colored, and can be made with tightly controlled particle sizes up to a few tens of nanometers across by reduction of gold chloride with citrate or ascorbate ions. Colloidal gold is used in research applications in medicine, biology and materials science. The technique of immunogold labeling exploits the ability of the gold particles to adsorb protein molecules onto their surfaces. Colloidal gold particles coated with specific antibodies can be used as probes for the presence and position of antigens on the surfaces of cells. In ultrathin sections of tissues viewed by electron microscopy, the immunogold labels appear as extremely dense round spots at the position of the antigen.

Gold, or alloys of gold and palladium, are applied as conductive coating to biological specimens and other non-conducting materials such as plastics and glass to be viewed in a scanning electron microscope. The coating, which is usually applied by sputtering with an argon plasma, has a triple role in this application. Gold's very high electrical conductivity drains electrical charge to earth, and its very high density provides stopping power for electrons in the electron beam, helping to limit the depth to which the electron beam penetrates the specimen. This improves definition of the position and topography of the specimen surface and increases the spatial resolution of the image. Gold also produces a high output of secondary electrons when irradiated by an electron beam, and these low-energy electrons are the most commonly used signal source used in the scanning electron microscope.

The isotope gold-198 (half-life 2.7 days) is used in nuclear medicine, in some cancer treatments and for treating other diseases.

=== Cuisine ===
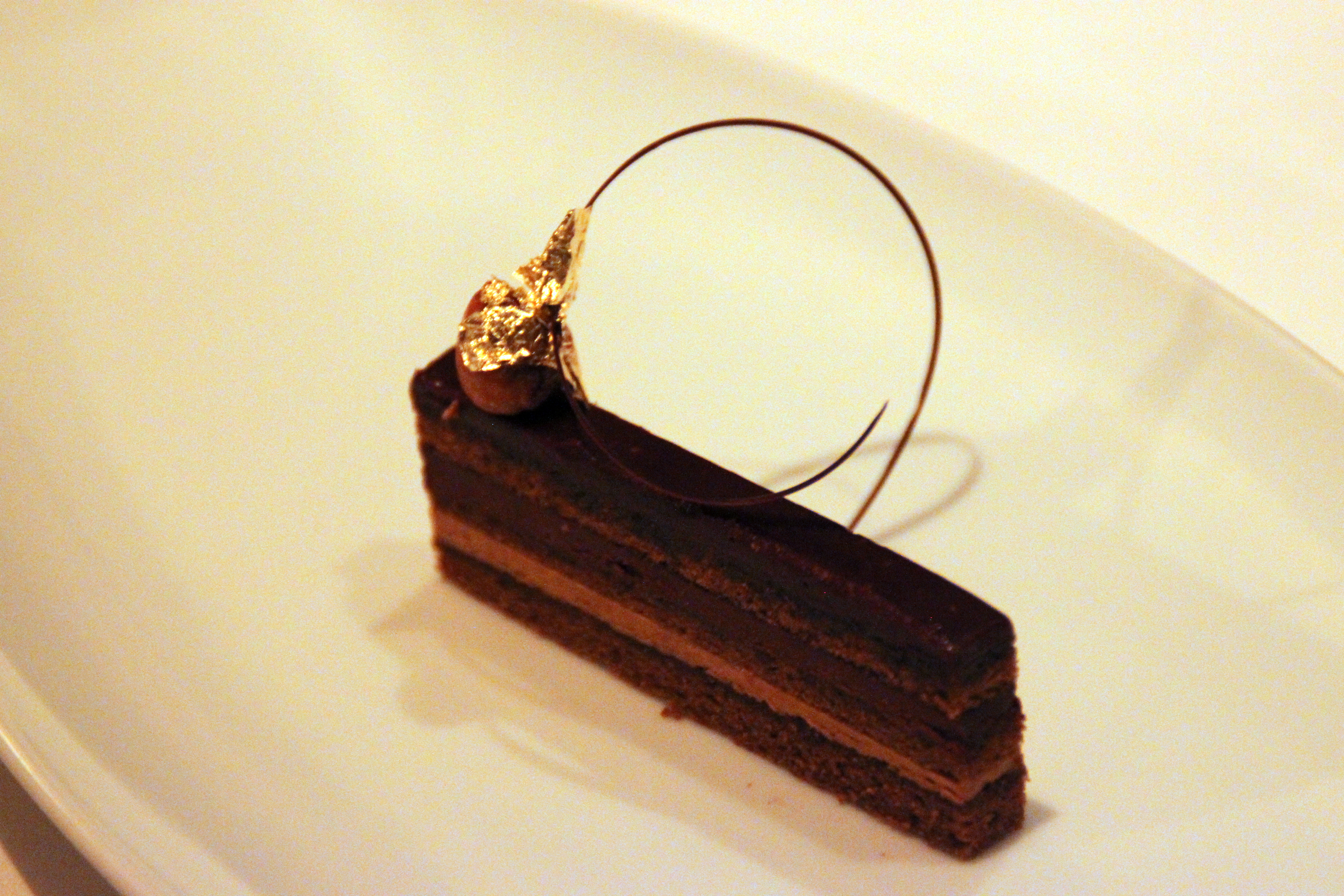
Cake with edible gold decoration

Gold can be used in food and has the E number 175. It can be applied as gold leaf, flake or dust for decorative purposes. Since metallic gold is generally considered inert to all body chemistry, it has no taste, provides no nutrition, and leaves the body unaltered. In 2016, the European Food Safety Authority published an opinion on the re-evaluation of gold as a food additive. Concerns included the possible presence of minute amounts of gold nanoparticles in the food additive, and that gold nanoparticles have been shown to be genotoxic in mammalian cells in vitro.

Decorative use of gold flake goes back to medieval Europe as a decoration in food and drinks among nobility. Leaf or flakes are used today in sweets and drinks. Vark is a foil or leaf composed of a pure metal that can include gold, and is used for garnishing sweets in South Asian cuisine.

Danziger Goldwasser (English: Goldwater) is a traditional German herbal liqueur produced in what is today Gdańsk, Poland, and Schwabach, Germany, and contains flakes of gold leaf. There are also some expensive (~ $1,000, equivalent to $1,501 in 2025) cocktails which contain flakes of gold leaf.

=== Miscellanea ===
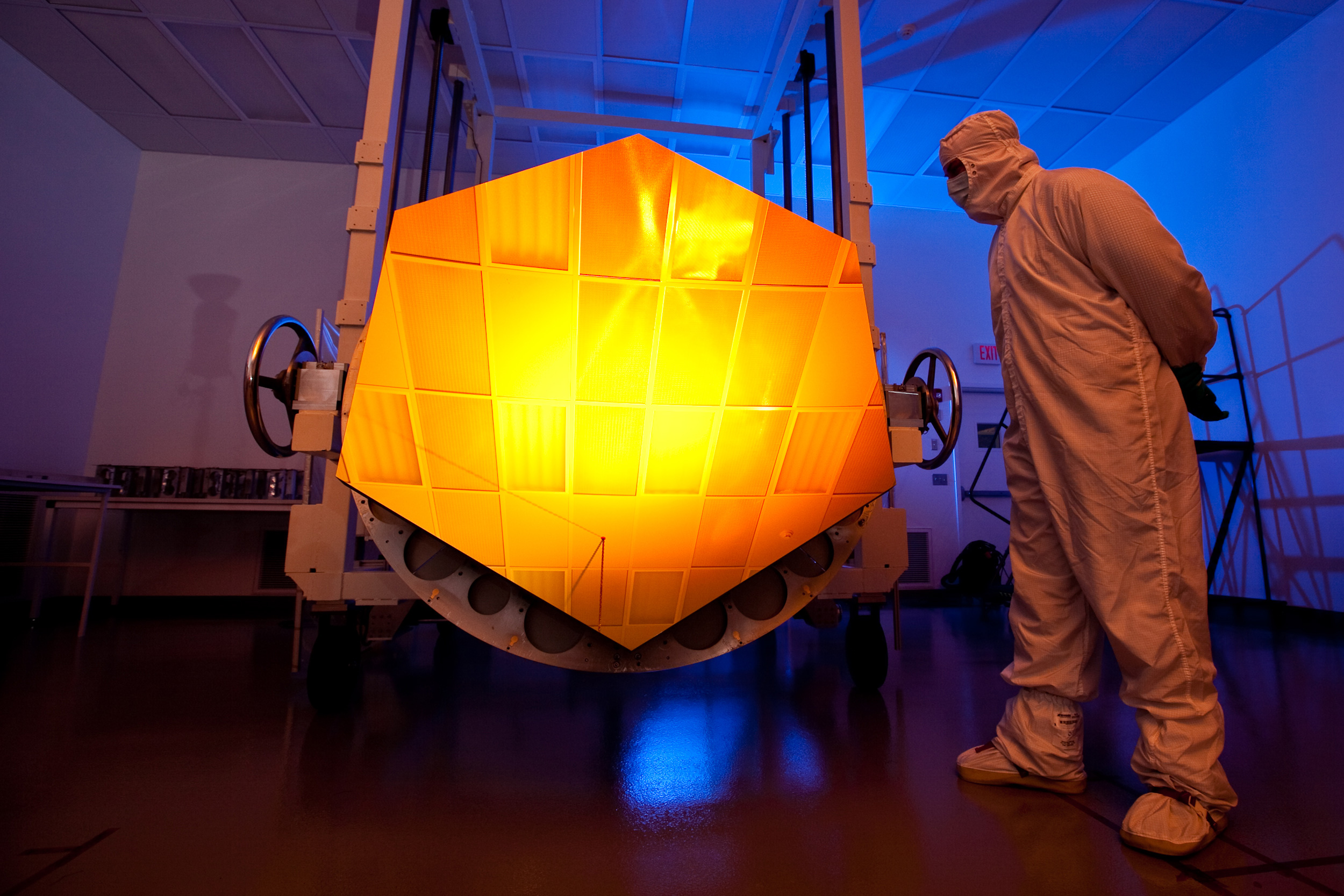
A mirror segment for the James Webb Space Telescope coated in gold to reflect infrared light

- Gold and its salts produce a deep, intense red color when used as a coloring agent in cranberry glass.
- In photography, gold toners are used to shift the color of silver bromide black-and-white prints towards brown or blue tones, or to increase their stability. Used on sepia-toned prints, gold toners produce red tones. Kodak published formulas for several types of gold toners, which use gold as the chloride.
- Gold is a good reflector of electromagnetic radiation such as infrared and visible light, as well as radio waves. It is used for the protective coatings on many artificial satellites, in infrared protective faceplates in thermal-protection suits and astronauts' helmets, and in electronic warfare planes such as the EA-6B Prowler.
- Gold is used as the reflective layer on some high-end CDs.
- Automobiles may use gold for heat shielding. McLaren uses gold foil in the engine compartment of its F1 model.
- Gold can be manufactured so thin that it appears semi-transparent. It is used in some aircraft cockpit windows for de-icing or anti-icing by passing electricity through it. The heat produced by the resistance of the gold is enough to prevent ice from forming.
- Gold is attacked by and dissolves in alkaline solutions of potassium or sodium cyanide, to form the salt gold cyanide—a technique that has been used in extracting metallic gold from ores in the cyanide process. Gold cyanide is the electrolyte used in commercial electroplating of gold onto base metals and electroforming.
- Gold chloride (chloroauric acid) solutions are used to make colloidal gold by reduction with citrate or ascorbate ions. Gold chloride and gold oxide are used to make cranberry or red-colored glass, which, like colloidal gold suspensions, contains evenly sized spherical gold nanoparticles.
- Gold, when dispersed in nanoparticles, can act as a heterogeneous catalyst of chemical reactions.
- In recent years, gold has been used as a symbol of pride by the autism rights movement, as its symbol Au could be seen as similar to the word "autism".

== Toxicity ==
Pure metallic (elemental) gold is non-toxic and non-irritating when ingested and is sometimes used as a food decoration in the form of gold leaf. Metallic gold is also a component of the alcoholic drinks Goldschläger, Gold Strike, and Goldwasser. Metallic gold is approved as a food additive in the EU (E175 in the Codex Alimentarius). Although the gold ion is toxic, the acceptance of metallic gold as a food additive is due to its relative chemical inertness, and resistance to being corroded or transformed into soluble salts (gold compounds) by any known chemical process which would be encountered in the human body.

Soluble compounds (gold salts) such as gold chloride are toxic to the liver and kidneys. Common cyanide salts of gold such as potassium gold cyanide, used in gold electroplating, are toxic by virtue of both their cyanide and gold content. There are rare cases of lethal gold poisoning from potassium gold cyanide. Gold toxicity can be ameliorated with chelation therapy with an agent such as dimercaprol.

Gold metal was voted Allergen of the Year in 2001 by the American Contact Dermatitis Society; gold contact allergies affect mostly women. Despite this, gold is a relatively non-potent contact allergen, in comparison with metals like nickel.

A sample of the fungus Aspergillus niger was found growing from gold mining solution; and was found to contain cyano metal complexes, such as gold, silver, copper, iron and zinc. The fungus also plays a role in the solubilization of heavy metal sulfides.

== See also ==
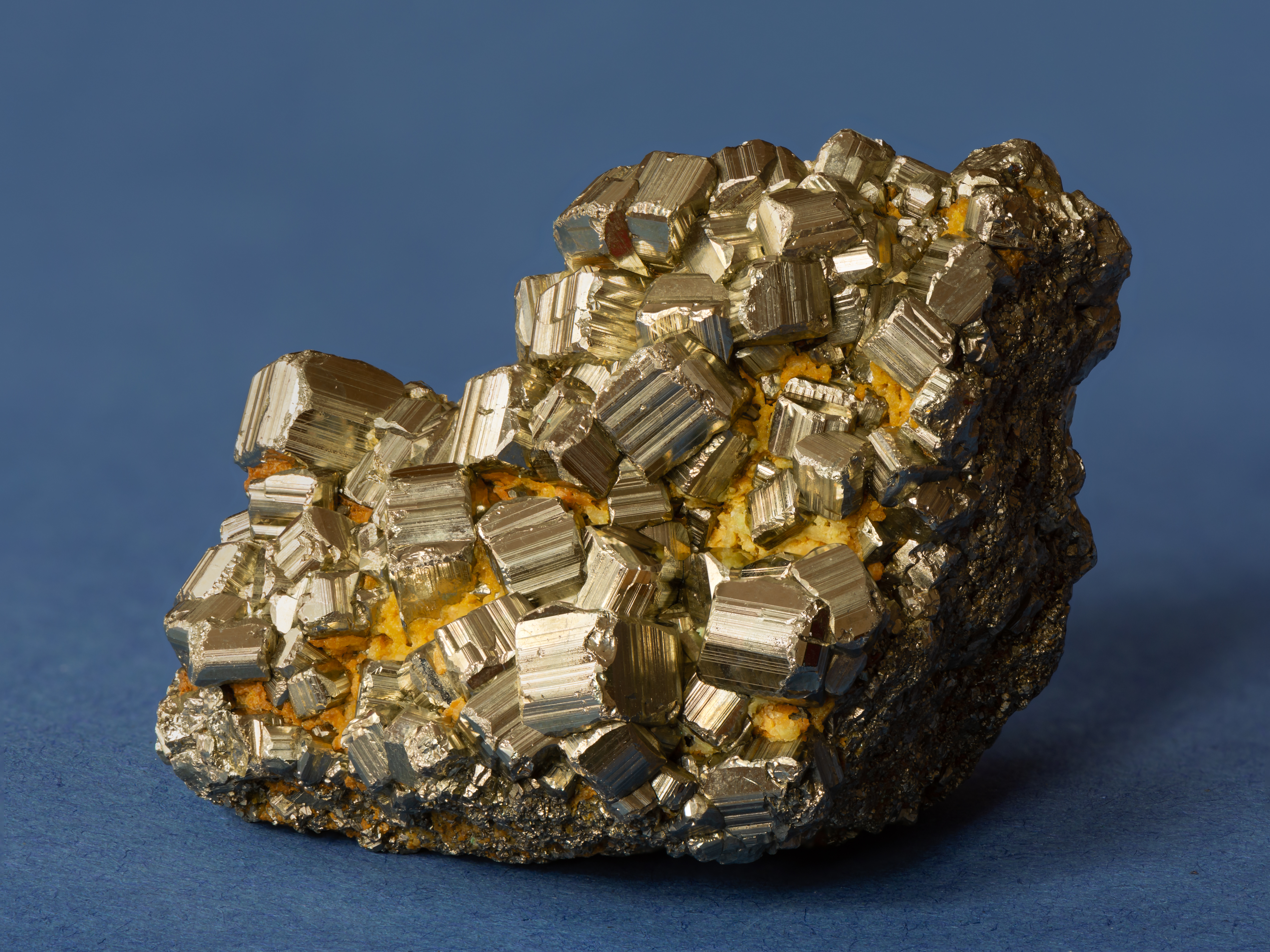
Iron pyrite or "fool's gold"

- Bulk leach extractable gold, for sampling ores
- Chrysiasis (dermatological condition)
- Digital gold currency, form of electronic currency
- GFMS business consultancy
- Gold (color), a range of colors
- Gold fingerprinting, use impurities to identify an alloy
- Gold standard in banking
- List of countries by gold production
- Tumbaga, alloy of gold and copper
- Iron pyrite, fool's gold
- Nordic gold, non-gold copper alloy
