= Bulk leach extractable gold =

Geochemical tool used during exploration for gold

Bulk leach extractable gold (BLEG) is a geochemical sampling and analytical technique used in gold exploration. In comparative studies with fire assay methods, it has been shown to improve the detection of low-level gold in large, representative samples and to reduce analytical variability associated with sample heterogeneity and the nugget effect.

It is broadly contemporaneous with other modern geochemical analytical techniques including aqua regia digestion, X-ray fluorescence spectroscopy, and laser ablation.

== Analysis ==
A large quantity of sample (between 2 and 5 kg) is digested or leached with cold sodium cyanide (NaCN) solution (generally 0.1% NaCN), for one to several days (depending on the assay laboratory involved). The gold is dissolved through its formation of a cyanide complex, which is concentrated through the solvent exchange process into an organic solvent and subsequently analyzed. The use of large sample weights and solvent extraction enables low detection limits, as low as 0.1 ppb. The digest is analyzed for Au (0.01 ppb), Cu (0.01 ppm), Ag (0.5 ppb), and depending on situations, for other elements. However, gold values in BLEG are lower than total assays such as those of fire assays, as it analyzes only the fine grained gold fraction and largely ignores coarser and nuggety gold.

If the need arises, a separate split of the original sample is used for pathfinder elements.

== Sampling considerations ==
BLEG requires the collection of large samples, generally greater than 2 kg. It is necessary to collect fine sized material – silt to clay – where the fine flakes of gold will reside. Given their shape, these fine flakes of gold do not act hydro-dynamically like heavy minerals, and will not settle in the same locations in a stream bed. Where possible, attempts should be made to sample flash flood sites (where finer material concentrates) – overbank deposits.

=== Vs sieving ===
BLEG is essentially a chemical sieve, designed to focus on the fine grained gold fraction. While many exploration geologists attest to the value of BLEG, some question its value compared to analyzing a simple sieved-out fine grained fraction. BLEG has been tried and tested over 20 years, applied successfully in different climatic settings, provides robust, excellent repeatability of results and has had an important role in discovery of massive Au deposits. However, some comparisons show that fine-grained sieved samples (<75 μm) show comparable results to BLEG, making the more complex process potentially unnecessary. With the exception of BLEGs applicability over a wider range of climatic conditions, the superiority of one method over the other is, at this point, still largely determined by personal preference.
