= Gold(II) sulfate =

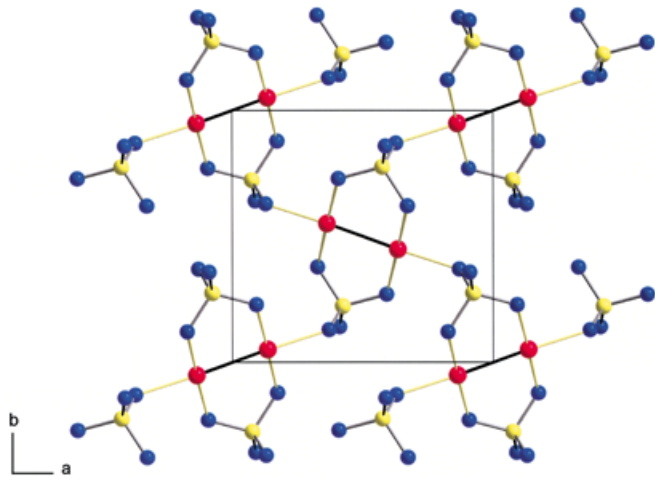
- Structure of gold(II) sulfate(Red spheres: Au; Yellow spheres: S; Blue spheres: O)

Names
- Other names: Gold sulfate; Digold disulfate

Identifiers
CAS Number	371777-29-6
3D model (JSmol)	Interactive image
- InChI: InChI=1S/2Au.2H2O4S/c;;2*1-5(2,3)4/h;;2*(H2,1,2,3,4)/q2*+2;;/p-4 Key: AVQFVNHKHZLJOY-UHFFFAOYSA-J
- SMILES: [O-]S(=O)(=O)[O-].[Au+2][Au+2].[O-]S(=O)(=O)[O-]

Properties
Molar mass	293.03 g/mol
Appearance	Red crystals
Density	5.51 g/cm^{3}

Structure
Crystal structure	Orthorhombic
Space group	Pbca
Lattice constant	a = 854.9 pm, b = 824.9 pm, c = 1001.4 pm
- Except where otherwise noted, data are given for materials in their standard state (at 25 °C [77 °F], 100 kPa). Infobox references

Gold(II) sulfate is the chemical compound with the formula AuSO_{4} or more correctly Au_{2}(SO_{4})_{2}. This compound was previously thought to be a mixed-valent compound like Au^{I}Au^{III}(SO_{4})_{2}, but it was later shown that it contained the diatomic cation Au_{2}^{4+}, making it one of the first known examples of an inorganic gold(II) compound. The bond distance between the gold atoms in the diatomic cation is 249 pm.

== Production and properties ==
Gold(II) sulfate is produced by reaction of sulfuric acid and gold(III) hydroxide. Gold(II) sulfate is unstable in air and oxidizes to hydrogen disulfoaurate(III) (HAu(SO_{4})_{2}).
