= Gold compounds =

Class of chemical compounds

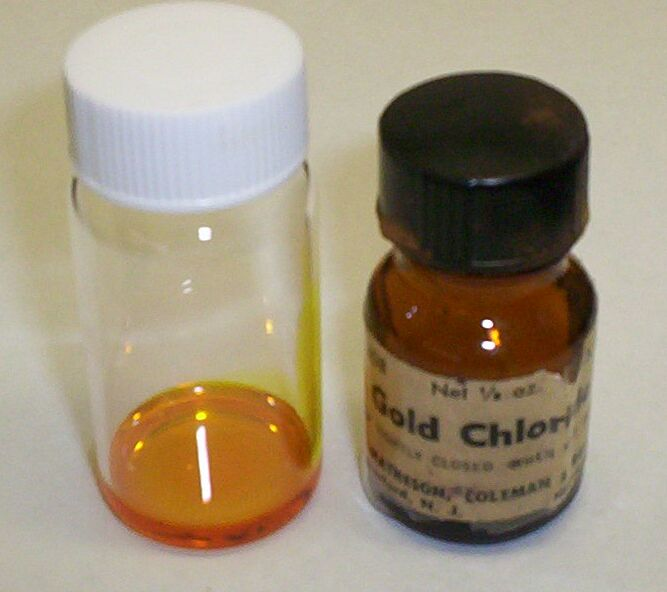
Gold(III) chloride solution in water

Gold compounds are compounds by the element gold (Au). Although gold is the most noble of the noble metals, it still forms many diverse compounds. The oxidation state of gold in its compounds ranges from −1 to +5, but Au(I) and Au(III) dominate its chemistry. Au(I), referred to as the aurous ion, is the most common oxidation state with soft ligands such as thioethers, thiolates, and organophosphines. Au(I) compounds are typically linear. A good example is Au(CN)^{−}_{2}, which is the soluble form of gold encountered in mining. The binary gold halides, such as AuCl, form zigzag polymeric chains, again featuring linear coordination at Au. Most drugs based on gold are Au(I) derivatives.

Au(III) (referred to as the auric) is a common oxidation state, and is illustrated by gold(III) chloride, Au_{2}Cl_{6}. The gold atom centers in Au(III) complexes, like other d^{8} compounds, are typically square planar, with chemical bonds that have both covalent and ionic character. Gold(I,III) chloride is also known, an example of a mixed-valence complex.

Gold does not react with dioxygen at any temperature and, up to 100 °C, is resistant to attack from ozone.

Some free halogens react with gold. Gold is strongly attacked by fluorine at dull-red heat to form gold(III) fluoride AuF_{3}. Powdered gold reacts with chlorine at 180 °C to form gold(III) chloride AuCl_{3}. Gold reacts with bromine at 140 °C to form gold(III) bromide AuBr_{3}, but reacts only very slowly with iodine to form gold(I) iodide AuI.

2 Au + 3 F_{2} → 2 AuF_{3}

2 Au + 3 Cl_{2} → 2 AuCl_{3}

2 Au + 2 Br_{2} → AuBr_{3} + AuBr

2 Au + I_{2} → 2 AuI

Gold does not react with sulfur directly, but gold(III) sulfide can be made by passing hydrogen sulfide through a dilute solution of gold(III) chloride or chloroauric acid.

Gold readily dissolves in mercury at room temperature to form an amalgam, and forms alloys with many other metals at higher temperatures. These alloys can be produced to modify the hardness and other metallurgical properties, to control melting point or to create exotic colors.

Gold is unaffected by most acids. It does not react with hydrofluoric, hydrochloric, hydrobromic, hydriodic, sulfuric, or nitric acid. It does react with selenic acid, and is dissolved by aqua regia, a 1:3 mixture of nitric acid and hydrochloric acid. Nitric acid oxidizes the metal to +3 ions, but only in minute amounts, typically undetectable in the pure acid because of the chemical equilibrium of the reaction. However, the ions are removed from the equilibrium by hydrochloric acid, forming AuCl^{−}_{4} ions, or chloroauric acid, thereby enabling further oxidation.

2Au + 6 H_{2}SeO_{4} → Au_{2}(SeO_{4})_{3} + 3 H_{2}SeO_{3} + 3H_{2}O [at 200°C]

Au + 4 HCl + HNO_{3} → H[AuCl_{4}] + NO↑ + 2H_{2}O

Gold is similarly unaffected by most bases. It does not react with aqueous, solid, or molten sodium or potassium hydroxide. It does however, react with sodium or potassium cyanide under alkaline conditions when oxygen is present to form soluble complexes.

Common oxidation states of gold include +1 (gold(I) or aurous compounds) and +3 (gold(III) or auric compounds). Gold ions in solution are readily reduced and precipitated as metal by adding any other metal as the reducing agent. The added metal is oxidized and dissolves, allowing the gold to be displaced from solution and be recovered as a solid precipitate.

== Rare oxidation states ==
Less common oxidation states of gold include −1, +2, and +5.

The −1 oxidation state occurs in aurides, compounds containing the Au^{−} anion. Caesium auride (CsAu), for example, crystallizes in the caesium chloride motif; rubidium, potassium, and tetramethylammonium aurides are also known. Gold has the highest electron affinity of any metal, at 222.8 kJ/mol, making Au^{−} a stable species, analogous to the halides.

Gold also has a –1 oxidation state in covalent complexes with the group 4 transition metals, such as in titanium tetraauride and the analogous zirconium and hafnium compounds. These chemicals are expected to form gold-bridged dimers in a manner similar to titanium(IV) hydride.

Gold(II) compounds are usually diamagnetic with Au–Au bonds such as [Au(CH_{2})_{2}P(C_{6}H_{5})_{2}]_{2}Cl_{2}. The evaporation of a solution of Au(OH)_{3} in concentrated H_{2}SO_{4} produces red crystals of gold(II) sulfate, Au_{2}(SO_{4})_{2}. Originally thought to be a mixed-valence compound, it has been shown to contain Au^{4+}_{2} cations, analogous to the better-known mercury(I) ion, Hg^{2+}_{2}. A gold(II) complex, the tetraxenonogold(II) cation, which contains xenon as a ligand, occurs in [AuXe_{4}](Sb_{2}F_{11})_{2}.

Gold pentafluoride, along with its derivative anion, AuF^{−}_{6}, and its difluorine complex, gold heptafluoride, is the sole example of gold(V), the highest verified oxidation state.

Some gold compounds exhibit aurophilic bonding, which describes the tendency of gold ions to interact at distances that are too long to be a conventional Au–Au bond but shorter than van der Waals bonding. The interaction is estimated to be comparable in strength to that of a hydrogen bond.

Well-defined cluster compounds are numerous. In some cases, gold has a fractional oxidation state. A representative example is the octahedral species {Au(P(C_{6}H_{5})_{3})}^{2+}_{6}.

Complexes of gold having the oxidation state 0 have also been synthesized.

== See also ==
- Copper compounds
- Silver compounds
