= Gold halide =

Compound of gold with a halogen

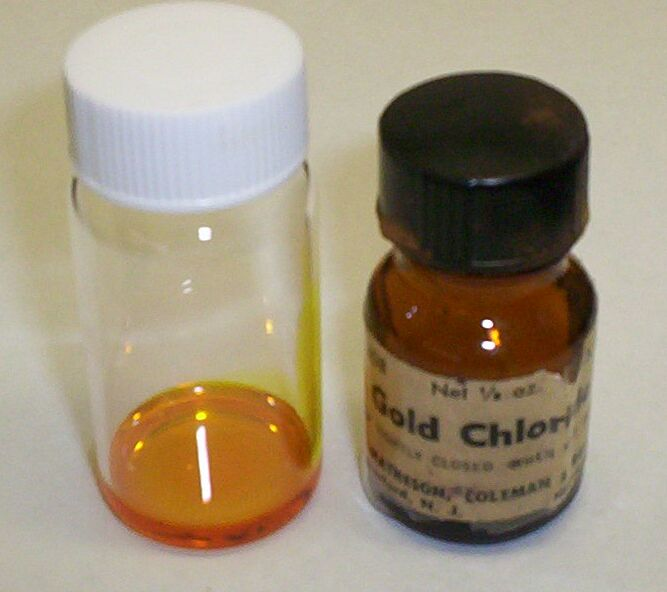
Concentrated aqueous solution of gold(III) chloride (auric chloride)

Gold halides are compounds of gold with the halogens.

== Monohalides ==
AuCl, AuBr, and AuI are all crystalline solids with a structure containing alternating linear chains: ..-X-Au-X-Au-X-Au-X-... The X-Au-X angle is less than 180°.

The monomeric AuF molecule has been detected in the gas phase.

== Trihalides ==
Gold triiodide does not exist or is unstable.

Gold(III) fluoride, AuF_{3}, has a unique polymeric helical structure, containing corner-sharing {AuF_{4}} squares.

== Pentahalides ==
Gold(V) fluoride, AuF_{5}, is the only known example of gold in the +5 oxidation state. It most commonly occurs as the dimer Au_{2}F_{10}.
