= Organogold chemistry =

Study of compounds containing gold–carbon bonds

Organogold chemistry is the study of compounds containing gold–carbon bonds. They are studied in academic research, but have not received widespread use otherwise. The dominant oxidation states for organogold compounds are I with coordination number 2 and a linear molecular geometry and III with CN = 4 and a square planar molecular geometry.

== Gold(I) ==
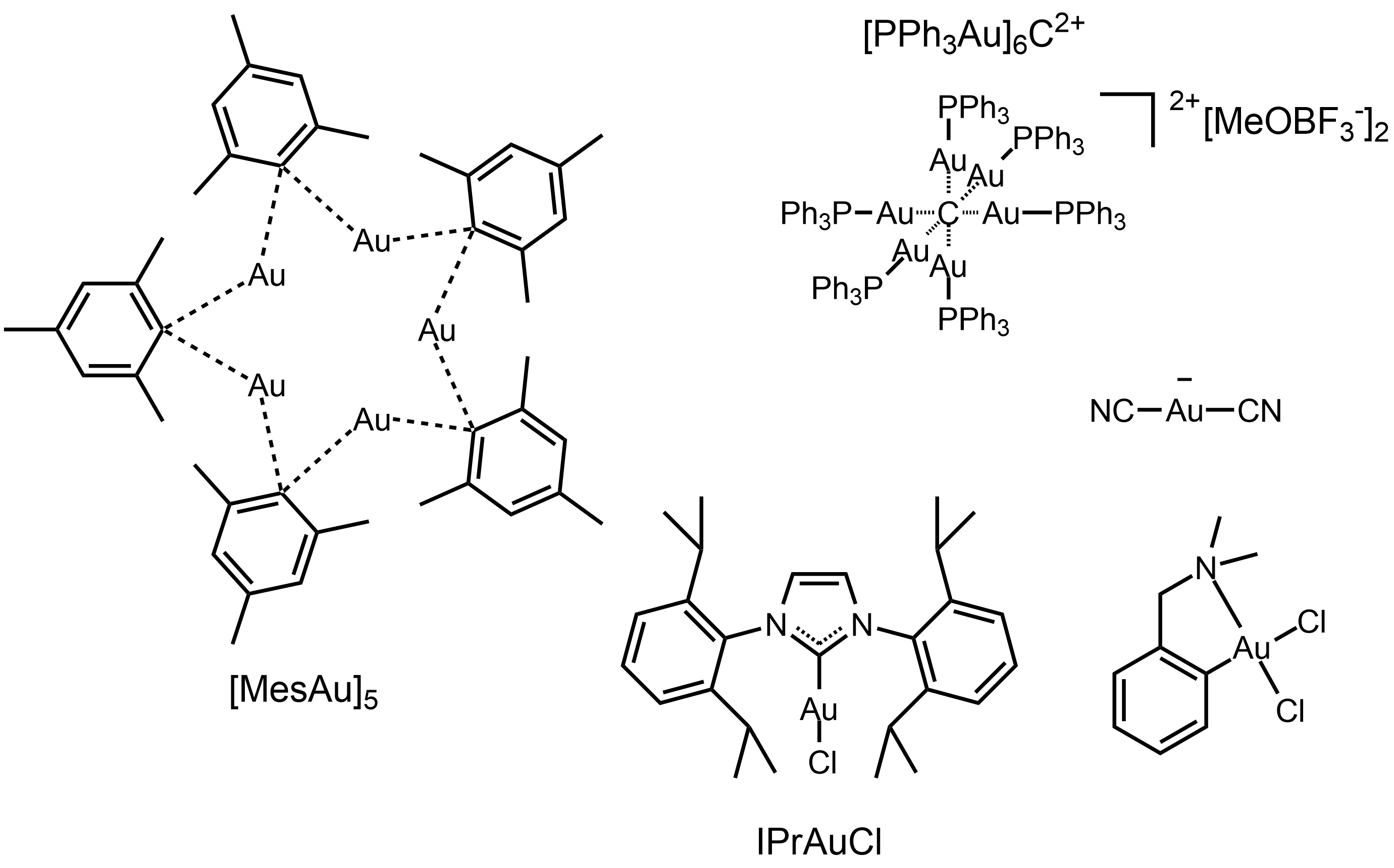
Some typical organogold species with assorted bonding modes.

Gold(I) complexes are 2-coordinate, linear, diamagnetic, 14 electron species. Many have the formula LAuR, with L = triphenylphosphine or an isocyanide. Gold(I) can also exist as the aurate M[AuR_{2}] (the ate complex) whereby the cation is usually fitted with a complexing agent to improve stability. The AuR_{2}^{−} anion is also linear just as other M(d^{10}) species such as Hg(Me)_{2} and Pd(Me)_{2}^{2+}. Gold forms acetylides (capable of forming polymeric structures), carbenes and carbynes. The classic method for the preparation of LAuR compounds is by reaction of a Grignard reagent with a gold(I) halide. A subsequent reaction with an organolithium R-Li forms the ate complex. The cyclic pentamer (MesAu)_{5} is formed by a reaction between Au(CO)Cl and the mesityl Grignard reagent. Gold cyanide compounds (MAu(CN)_{2}) are of some importance to gold cyanidation, a process for the extraction of gold from low-grade ore. The carbon to metal bond in metal cyanides is usually ionic but evidence exists that the C-Au bonding in the gold cyanide ion is covalent.

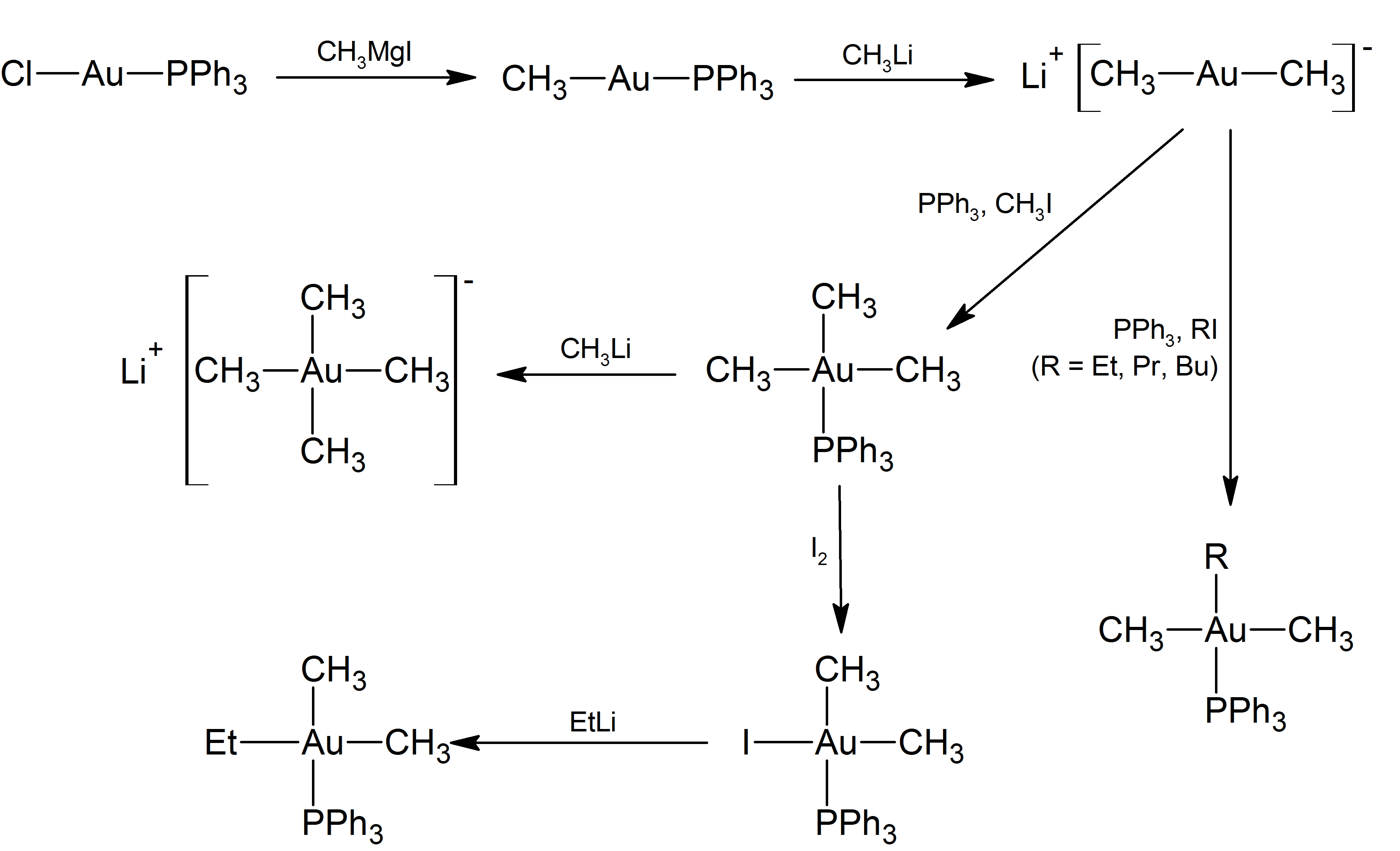
Reaction scheme of Au(I) and Au(III) organometallic compounds, with (Ph_{3}P)AuCl as the precursor.

=== Alkene and alkyne complexes ===
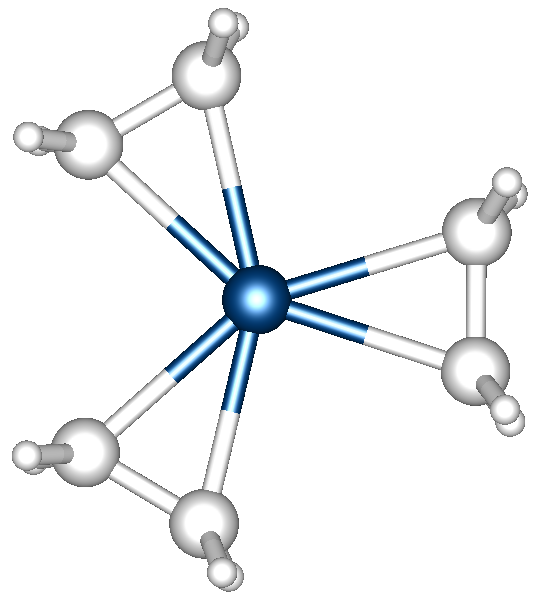
Structure of [Au(C_{2}H_{4})_{3}]^{+}. The C-C and Au-C distances are 137 and 171 picometers, respectively. Color code: blue = Au, white = C and H.

Isolated and characterized examples of gold(I) complexes of alkenes and alkynes are relatively rare, despite these species often being invoked as intermediates. A two-coordinate complex [(R_{3}P)Au(C_{2}H_{4})]^{+} has been crystallized (as its hexafluoroantimonate salt) for the very bulky phosphine ligand (R = 4,4′-di-tert-butylbiphenylyl). The tris(ethylene) complex is also known.

== Gold(III) ==
Gold(III) complexes are 4 coordinate, square planar, diamagnetic, toxic, 16 electron species. When the formal coordination number is less than 4, ligands such as chlorine can make up for it by forming a bridging ligand. Intramolecular chelation is another strategy. In general gold(III) compounds are toxic and therefore less studied than gold(I). Monoarylgold(III) complexes are one well-studied class of complexes. They are often prepared by direct electrophilic auration of arenes by AuCl_{3}. Homoleptic tetraalkylaurate(III) complexes (e.g. Li[AuMe_{4}]) are also well-characterized.

== Bonding ==
The bonding in gold complexes is subject to normal and some exceptional factors, which have been described as aurophilicity.

The Dewar–Chatt–Duncanson model applies to gold complexes of alkenes and alkynes, although isolated examples of such complexes are rare, in part due to the relatively weak degree of backbonding of late transition metals. When compared to analogous complexes based on lighter congeners copper and silver, the computed difference in magnitude between π→M bonding and M→π* backbonding was found to be the most significant for a complex based on gold, in line with the high degree of electrophilicity of gold complexes observed catalytically.

Relativistic effects are significant in organogold chemistry due to the large nuclear charge of the metal (Z = 79). As a consequence of relativistically expanded 5d orbitals, the LAu fragment can stabilize a neighboring carbocation via electron donation into the empty p-type orbital. Thus, in addition to their expected carbocation-like reactivity, these cations also exhibit significant carbene character, a property that has been exploited in catalytic transformations such as cyclopropanation and C-H insertion.

== Gold catalysis ==
Gold(I) chloride, gold(III) chloride, and chloroauric acid function as homogeneous catalysta, but they quickly deactivate or form precipitates. Phosphine- or NHC-ligated gold(I) complexes are more robust. These complex are typically prepared and stored as the bench-stable (but unreactive) chlorides, LAuCl, e.g., chloro(triphenylphosphine)gold(I), which are typically activated via halide abstraction with silver salts like AgOTf, AgBF_{4}, or AgSbF_{6} to generate a cationic gold(I) species. Although the coordinatively unsaturated complex "LAu^{+}" is notionally generated from a LAuCl/AgX mixture, the exact nature of the cationic gold species and the role of the silver salt remains somewhat contentious. The para-nitrobenzoate, bistriflimide, and certain nitrile complexes represent catalytically active yet isolable silver-free precatalysts.

Cationic gold(I) forms π-complexes with alkene or alkynes. These complexes are similar to those of mercury(II) and platinum(II). Electrophilic ions and complexes such as these with a strong propensity to form π-complexes are generally known as pi(π)-acids (see also: cation–pi interaction).

Gold(I)-alkene and -alkyne complexes are susceptible to nucleophilic attack. In oxymercuration the resultant organomercurial species is generated stoichiometrically, and requires an additional step to liberate the product. In the case of gold, protonolysis of the Au-C bond closes the catalytic cycle, allowing the coordination of another substrate. Some practical advantages of gold(I) catalysis include: 1) air stability (due to the high oxidation potential of Au(I)), 2) tolerance towards adventitious moisture (due its low oxophilicity), and 3) relatively low toxicity compared to other pi-acids (e.g., Pt(II) and Hg(II)). Chemically, Au(I) complexes typically do not undergo oxidation to higher oxidation states, and Au(I)-alkyls and -vinyls are not susceptible to β hydride elimination.

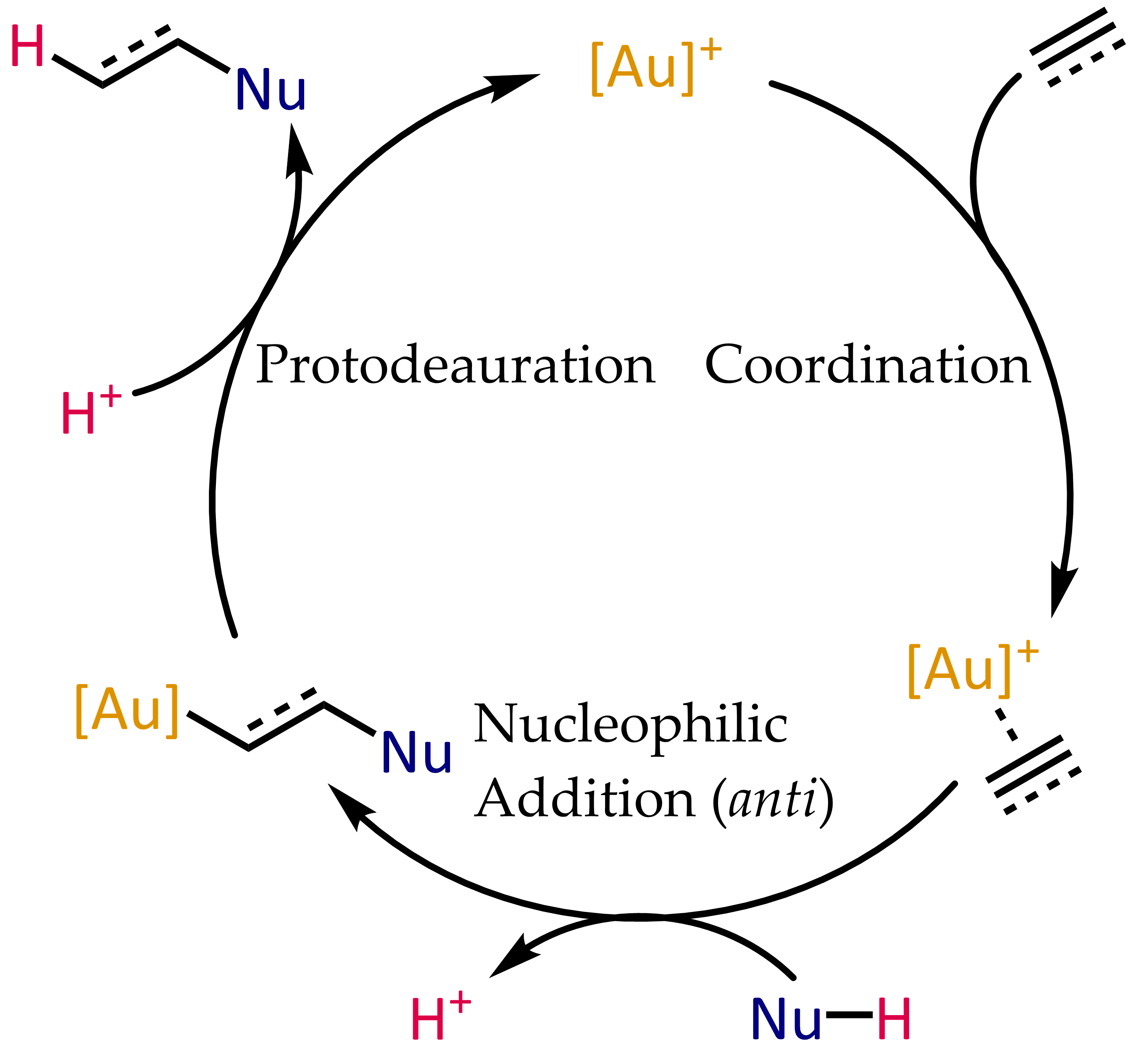
Typical mechanism for the gold(I)-catalyzed hydrofunctionalization of alkynes and allenes.

=== Historical development ===
The hydration of phenylacetylene to acetophenone using tetrachloroauric acid in a 37% yield was reported in 1976. An analogous mercury(II)-promote reaction was known. This same study lists a published yield >150%, indicating catalysis that perhaps was not acknowledged by the chemists.

The reaction of the gold(III) salt NaAuCl_{4}) with alkynes and water was reported in 1991. A major drawback of this method as Au(III) is rapidly reduced to catalytically inactive metallic gold and in 1998 returned to the theme of ligand supported Au(I) for the same transformation:

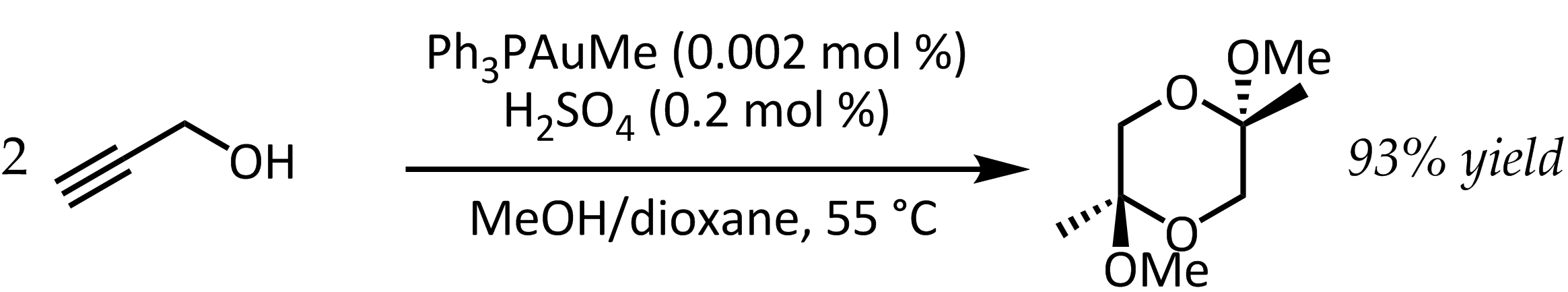

This particular reaction demonstrated fantastic catalytic efficiency and would trigger a flurry of research into the use of phosphinegold(I) complexes for the activation C-C multiple bonds in the years to come. In spite of the lower stability of gold(III) complexes under catalytic conditions, simple AuCl_{3} was also found to be an efficient catalyst in some cases. For instance, Hashmi reported an AuCl_{3}-catalyzed alkyne / furan Diels–Alder reaction - a type of cycloaddition that does not ordinarily occur - for the synthesis of 2,3-disubstituted phenols:

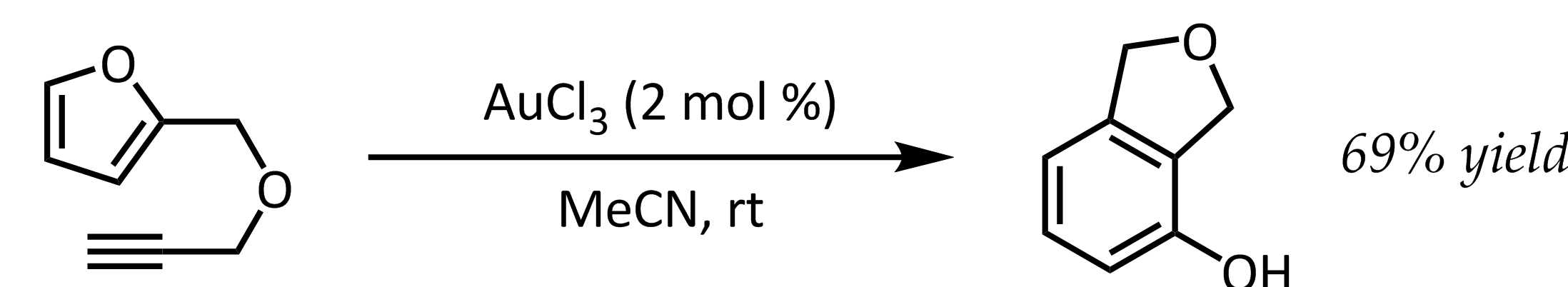

Further mechanistic studies conclude that this is not a concerted transformation, but rather an initial alkyne hydroarylation followed by a series of non-obvious intramolecular rearrangements, concluding with a 6π electrocyclization and rearomatization.

Propargyl esters can serve as precursors for cationic gold-vinylcarbene intermediates, which can react with alkenes in a concerted manner to afford the cyclopropanation product. The use of a chiral ligand ((R)-DTBM-SEGPHOS) resulted in good to excellent levels of enantioselectivity.

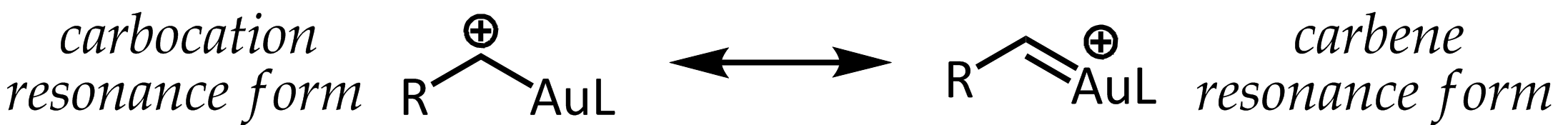

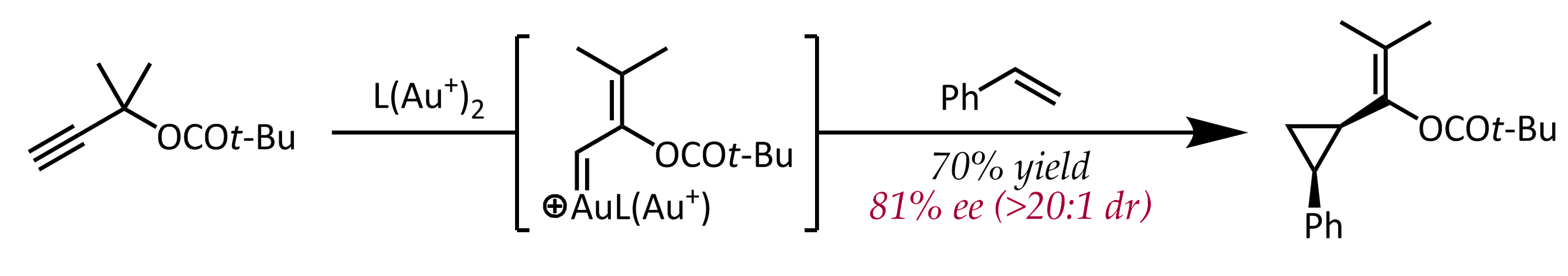

Chiral bisphosphinedigold(I) complexes serve as enantioselective catalysts. an early, atypical example of enantioselective catalysis by gold was described by Hayashi and Ito in 1986. In this process, benzaldehyde and methyl isocyanoacetate undergo cyclization in the presence of a chiral ferrocenylphosphine ligand and a bis(isocyanide)gold(I) complex to form a chiral oxazoline. Since oxazolines can be hydrolyzed to provide a 1,2-aminoalcohol, this reaction constitutes the first example of a catalytic, asymmetric aldol reaction.

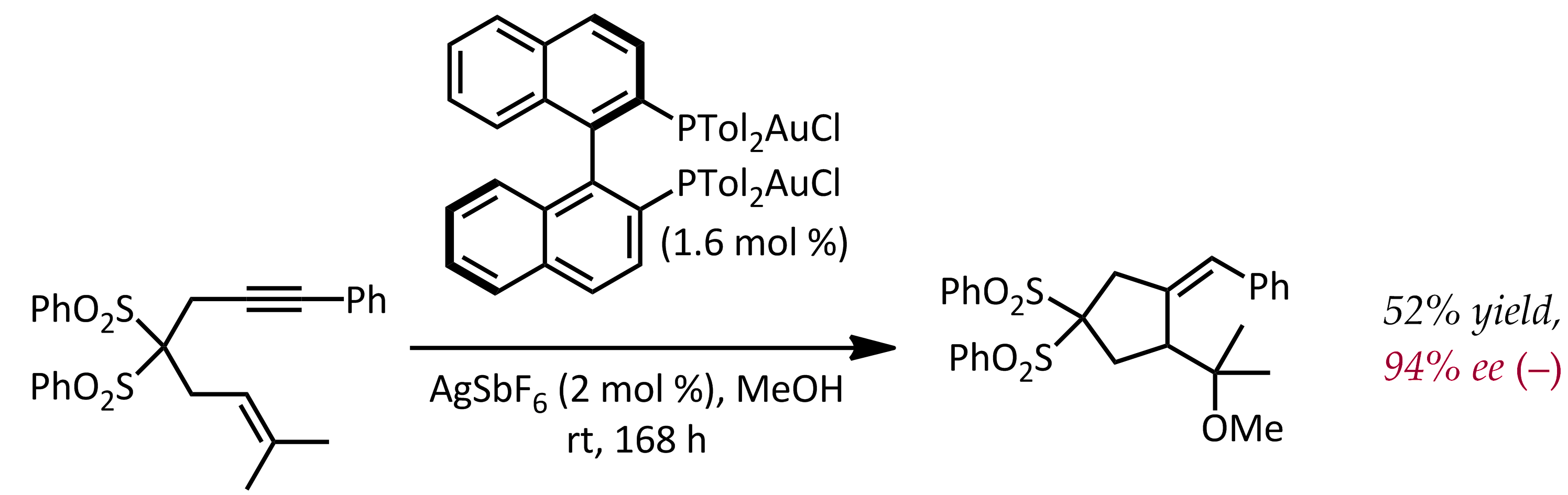

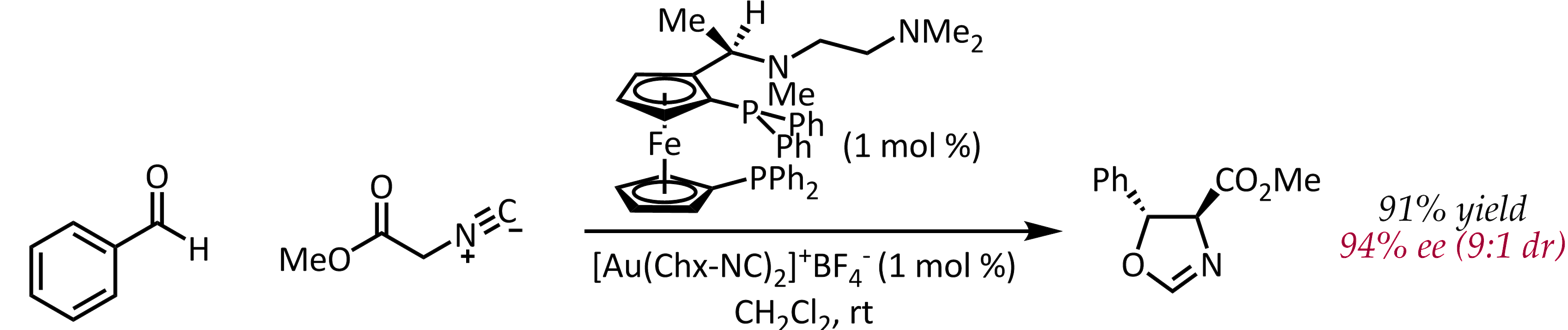

In contrast to the other reactions described above, this reaction does not involve activation of a C-C double or triple bond by gold. In a simple mechanistic picture, gold(I) simultaneously coordinates to two phosphine ligands and the carbon isocyanate group which is then attacked by the carbonyl group. Further studies on the bonding mode of Au(I) indicate that this simple picture may have to be revised.

Heterogeneous gold catalysis is an older science. Gold is an attractive metal to use because of its stability against oxidation and its variety in morphology for instance gold cluster materials. Gold has been shown to be effective in low-temperature CO oxidation and acetylene hydrochlorination to vinyl chlorides. The exact nature of the catalytic site in this type of process is debated. The notion that gold can catalyse a reaction does not imply it is the only way. However, other metals can do the same job inexpensively, notably in recent years iron (see organoiron chemistry).

== Gold catalyzed reactions ==
Gold catalyzes many organic transformations, usually carbon-carbon bond formation from Au(I), and C-X (X = O, N) bond formation from the Au(III) state, due to that ion's harder Lewis acidity. During the past decade, several studies have demonstrated that gold can efficiently catalyze C-C and C-heteroatom cross-coupling reactions that proceed through an Au(I)/Au(III) cycle. Reactions forming cyclic compounds can be classified into four categories:

- heteroatom nucleophilic addition to unsaturated C-C bonds, especially to form small heterocycles (furans, pyrroles, thiophenes)
- Hydroarylation: basically a Friedel-Crafts reaction using metal-alkyne complexes. Example, the reaction of mesitylene with phenylacetylene:

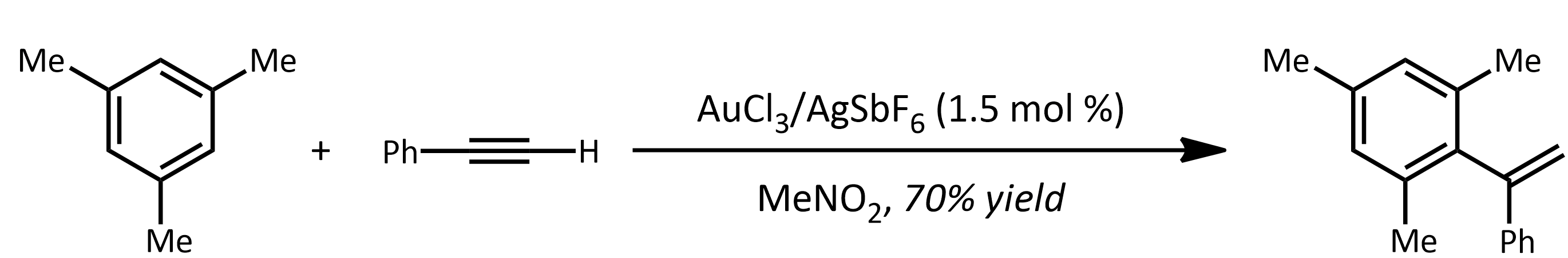

- Enyne cyclization, in particular cycloisomerization, one early example being a 5-exo-dig 1,6 enyne cycloisomerization:

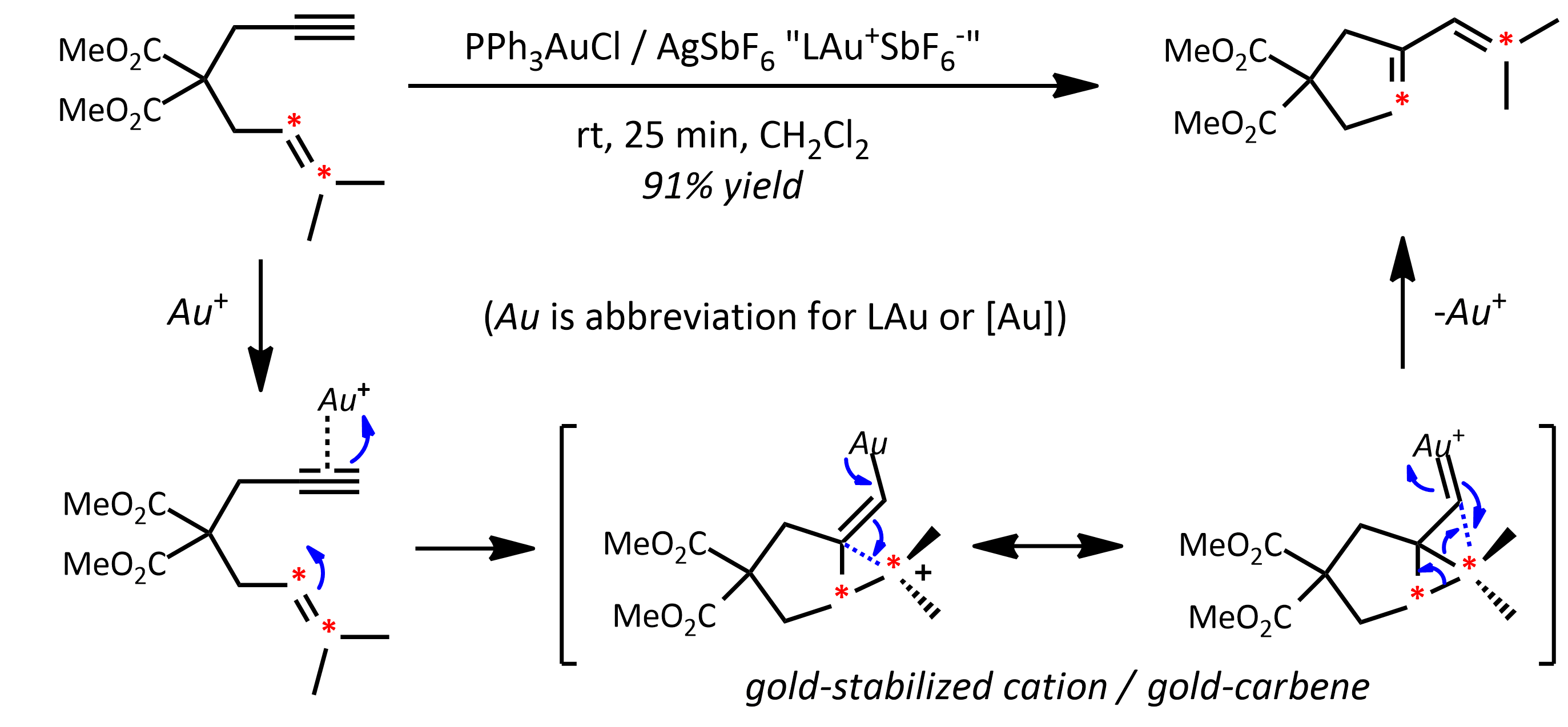

- cycloaddition reactions with early example the cycloaddition of a nitrile oxide with an alkyne.

Other reactions are the use of gold in C–H bond activation and aldol reactions. Gold also catalyses coupling reactions.

=== Limitations ===
Gold is very rarely used in homogeneous catalysis, despite significant efforts. While gold-catalyzed hydrofunctionalization of alkynes, allenes, and allylic alcohols occurs readily mild conditions, unactivated alkenes remain poor substrates. One problem is the reluctance of alkylgold(I) complexes to undergo protodeauration. The development of intermolecular gold-catalyzed transformations has also lagged behind the development of intramolecular ones, which further limits substrate scope.
