= Gold bromide =

Gold bromide may refer to:

- Gold(III) bromide, a dark-red to black crystalline solid
- Gold(I) bromide, a crystalline solid that may be formed from the elements or partial decomposition of gold(III) bromide
