= Isostructural =

Compounds having similar chemical structure

Isostructural chemical compounds have similar chemical structures. "Isomorphous" when used in the relation to crystal structures is not synonymous: in addition to the same atomic connectivity that characterises isostructural compounds, isomorphous substances crystallise in the same space group and have the same unit cell dimensions. The IUCR definition used by crystallographers is:

Two crystals are said to be isostructural, if they have the same structure, but not necessarily the same cell dimensions nor the same chemical composition, and with a "comparable" variability in the atomic coordinates to that of the cell dimensions and chemical composition. For instance, calcite CaCO_{3}, sodium nitrate NaNO_{3} and iron borate FeBO_{3} are isostructural. One also speaks of isostructural series, or of isostructural polymorphs or isostructural phase transitions. The term isotypic is synonymous with isostructural.

Examples include:

- I-Gold(I) bromide is isostructural with gold(I) chloride
- Borazine is isostructural with benzene
- Indium(I) bromide is isostructural with β-thallium(I) iodide and has a distorted rock salt structure.

Many minerals are isostructural when they differ only in the nature of a cation.

Compounds which are isoelectronic usually have similar chemical structures. For example, methane, CH_{4}, and the ammonium ion, NH_{4}^{+}, are isoelectric and are isostructural as both have a tetrahedral structure. The C–H and N–H bond lengths are different and crystal structures are completely different because the ammonium ion only occurs in salts.
