= Ammonium tetrachloroaurate =

Names
- IUPAC name Ammonium tetrachloroaurate(III)

Identifiers
| CAS Number | 31113-23-2; hydrate: 13874-04-9 |
| 3D model (JSmol) | Interactive image; hydrate: Interactive image |
| ChemSpider | 10773247 |
| ECHA InfoCard | 100.205.444 |
| EC Number | 250-476-0; hydrate: 680-381-3 |
| PubChem CID | 56845482; hydrate: 16211474 |
| CompTox Dashboard (EPA) | DTXSID70953216; hydrate: DTXSID30583432 |
- InChI: InChI=1S/Au.4ClH.H3N/h;4*1H;1H3/q+3;;;;;/p-3 Key: WPEJSSRSFRWYJB-UHFFFAOYSA-K; hydrate: InChI=1S/Au.4ClH.H3N.H2O/h;4*1H;1H3;1H2/q+3;;;;;;/p-3 Key: DTYXSEJVOCMIPK-UHFFFAOYSA-K
- SMILES: [NH4+].Cl[Au-](Cl)(Cl)Cl; hydrate: [NH4+].O.Cl[Au-](Cl)(Cl)Cl

Properties
| Chemical formula | AuCl_{4}H_{4}N |
| Molar mass | 356.81 g·mol^{−1} |
| Appearance | orange-red crystals |
| Solubility in water | slightly soluble |

Hazards
- GHS labelling
| Pictograms | (GHS05: Corrosive) (GHS06: Toxic) |
| Signal word | Danger |
- Except where otherwise noted, data are given for materials in their standard state (at 25 °C [77 °F], 100 kPa). Infobox references

Ammonium tetrachloroaurate is an inorganic chemical compound with the chemical formula NH_{4}AuCl_{4}.

== Synthesis ==
Ammonium tetrachloroaurate can be obtained by reacting a saturated solution of gold(III) chloride with ammonium chloride in hydrochloric acid.

== Physical properties ==
The compound is slightly soluble in water and ethanol. It forms hydrates.

Ammonium tetrachloroaurate forms orange-yellow crystals. The hydrate has a monoclinic crystal structure with the space group C 2/ c (space group no. 15).

Ammonium tetrachloroaurate decomposes in air at temperatures from 230 to 350 °C . The decomposition reaction is endothermic.

== Uses ==
The hydrate is used to prepare Pd-Au alloy films.

Ammonium tetrachloroaurate can be used to produce gold nanoparticles.
