= Neptunium(IV) iodate =

Names
- IUPAC name Neptunium(IV) iodate

Identifiers
CAS Number	39980-75-1

Properties
Chemical formula	Np(IO_{3})_{4}
Molar mass	936.60 g/mol
Appearance	Pleochroic crystals, appearing grey, green or black depending on viewing angle
Density	6.006 g/cm^{3} (−80 °C)

Hazards
- Occupational safety and health (OHS/OSH)
Main hazards	Radioactive
- Except where otherwise noted, data are given for materials in their standard state (at 25 °C [77 °F], 100 kPa). Infobox references

Neptunium(IV) iodate is an inorganic compound of neptunium with the chemical formula Np(IO_{3})_{4}. It is a radioactive crystalline solid and one of several known iodates of neptunium.

== Properties ==
Neptunium(IV) iodate is pleochroic. Depending on the orientation of the crystals, its colour can vary from grey through green to black.

The anhydrous compound crystallizes in the tetragonal crystal system, in the space group P4_{2}/n. Each Np(IV) centre is surrounded by eight oxygen atoms in a distorted dodecahedral coordination geometry. The iodate anions bridge adjacent neptunium centres, producing one-dimensional chains. These chains pack together in a pinwheel-like arrangement.

The Np–O bond lengths in the structure are approximately 2.329 and 2.358 Å, each occurring four times around the neptunium atom. The I–O bond lengths range from about 1.782 to 1.827 Å.

Np(IO_{3})_{4} is isostructural with plutonium(IV) iodate, Pu(IO_{3})_{4}, and cerium(IV) iodate, Ce(IO_{3})_{4}. Despite the expected similarity between Th(IV) and the heavier tetravalent actinides, the corresponding anhydrous thorium compound was not obtained in the same study.

A hydrated neptunium(IV) iodate phase, represented as Np(IO_{3})_{4}·nH_{2}O·nHIO_{3}, is also known. In contrast to the one-dimensional structure of the anhydrous compound, the hydrated phase contains nine-coordinate neptunium centres in tricapped trigonal-prismatic environments linked into a three-dimensional framework. Channels within this framework are partially occupied by water molecules and iodate species.

Magnetic susceptibility measurements indicate that the Np(IV) ions in Np(IO_{3})_{4} are magnetically isolated, with no strong magnetic coupling between neighbouring neptunium centres.

== Preparation ==
Neptunium(IV) iodate can be produced under acidic hydrothermal conditions. Reactions of ^{237}NpO_{2} with excess iodate at about 200 °C produce different neptunium iodates depending strongly on the acidity and the amount of water present.

Lower water content and greater acidity favour reduced Np(IV) products, including Np(IO_{3})_{4}, whereas larger quantities of water favour neptunium(V) and neptunium(VI) iodates. Under suitable hydrothermal conditions, neptunium(VI) iodates can also be converted into Np(IV) iodates. In one experiment, crystals of Np(IO_{3})_{4} and its hydrated phase were observed growing directly on crystals of NpO_{2}(IO_{3})_{2}(H_{2}O), suggesting a surface-mediated solid-to-solid transformation.
