= Silver compounds =

Chemical compounds containing silver

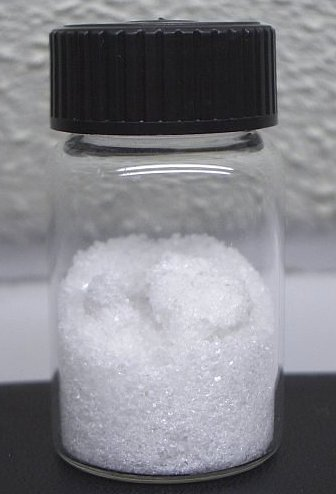
A sample of silver nitrate, a compound of silver

Silver is a relatively unreactive metal, although it can form several compounds. The common oxidation states of silver are (in order of commonness): +1 (the most stable state; for example, silver nitrate, AgNO_{3}); +2 (highly oxidising; for example, silver(II) fluoride, AgF_{2}); and even very rarely +3 (extreme oxidising; for example, potassium tetrafluoroargentate(III), KAgF_{4}). The +3 state requires very strong oxidising agents to attain, such as fluorine or peroxodisulfate, and some silver(III) compounds react with atmospheric moisture and attack glass. Indeed, silver(III) fluoride is usually obtained by reacting silver or silver monofluoride with the strongest known oxidizing agent, krypton difluoride.

== Oxides and chalcogenides ==
=== Oxides ===
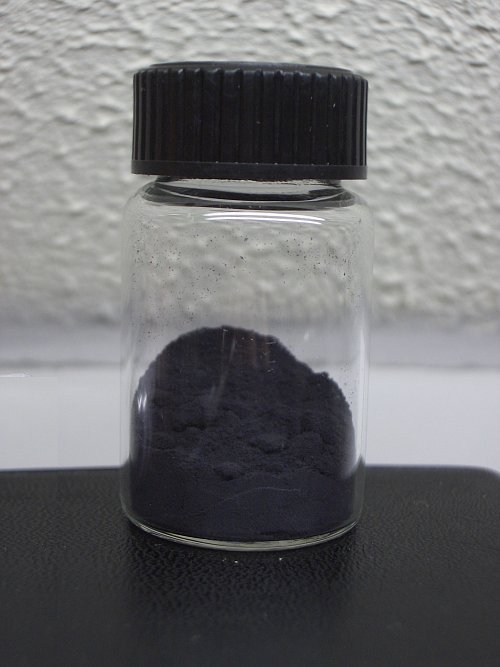
Some silver oxide powder.

Silver and gold have rather low chemical affinities for oxygen, lower than copper, and it is therefore expected that silver oxides are thermally quite unstable. Soluble silver(I) salts precipitate dark-brown silver(I) oxide, Ag_{2}O, upon the addition of alkali. (The hydroxide AgOH exists only in solution; otherwise it spontaneously decomposes to the oxide.) Silver(I) oxide is very easily reduced to metallic silver, and decomposes to silver and oxygen above 160 °C. This and other silver(I) compounds may be oxidized by the strong oxidizing agent peroxodisulfate to black AgO, a mixed silver(I,III) oxide of formula Ag^{I}Ag^{III}O_{2}. Some other mixed oxides with silver in non-integral oxidation states, namely Ag_{2}O_{3} and Ag_{3}O_{4}, are also known, as is Ag_{3}O which behaves as a metallic conductor.

=== Other chalcogenides ===
Silver(I) sulfide, Ag_{2}S, is very readily formed from its constituent elements and is the cause of the black tarnish on some old silver objects. It may also be formed from the reaction of hydrogen sulfide with silver metal or aqueous Ag^{+} ions. Many non-stoichiometric selenides and tellurides are known; in particular, AgTe_{~3} is a low-temperature superconductor.

== Halides ==
The three common silver halide precipitates: from left to right, silver iodide, silver bromide, and silver chloride.

The only known dihalide of silver is the difluoride, AgF_{2}, which can be obtained from the elements under heat. A strong yet thermally stable and therefore safe fluorinating agent, silver(II) fluoride is often used to synthesize hydrofluorocarbons.

In stark contrast to this, all four silver(I) halides are known. The fluoride, chloride, and bromide have the sodium chloride structure, but the iodide has three known stable forms at different temperatures; that at room temperature is the cubic zinc blende structure. They can all be obtained by the direct reaction of their respective elements. As the halogen group is descended, the silver halide gains more and more covalent character, solubility decreases, and the color changes from the white chloride to the yellow iodide as the energy required for ligand-metal charge transfer (X^{−}Ag^{+} → XAg) decreases. The fluoride is anomalous, as the fluoride ion is so small that it has a considerable solvation energy and hence is highly water-soluble and forms di- and tetrahydrates. The other three silver halides are highly insoluble in aqueous solutions and are very commonly used in gravimetric analytical methods. All four are photosensitive (though the monofluoride is so only to ultraviolet light), especially the bromide and iodide which photodecompose to silver metal, and thus were used in traditional photography. The reaction involved is:

X^{−} + hν → X + e^{−} (excitation of the halide ion, which gives up its extra electron into the conduction band)
Ag^{+} + e^{−} → Ag (liberation of a silver ion, which gains an electron to become a silver atom)

The process is not reversible because the silver atom liberated is typically found at a crystal defect or an impurity site, so that the electron's energy is lowered enough that it is "trapped".

== Other inorganic compounds ==
Silver crystals forming on a copper surface in a silver nitrate solution. Video by Maxim Bilovitskiy

White silver nitrate, AgNO_{3}, is a versatile precursor to many other silver compounds, especially the halides, and is much less sensitive to light. It was once called lunar caustic because silver was called luna by the ancient alchemists, who believed that silver was associated with the Moon. It is often used for gravimetric analysis, exploiting the insolubility of the heavier silver halides which it is a common precursor to. Silver nitrate is used in many ways in organic synthesis, e.g. for deprotection and oxidations. Ag^{+} binds alkenes reversibly, and silver nitrate has been used to separate mixtures of alkenes by selective absorption. The resulting adduct can be decomposed with ammonia to release the free alkene.

Yellow silver carbonate, Ag_{2}CO_{3} can be easily prepared by reacting aqueous solutions of sodium carbonate with a deficiency of silver nitrate. Its principal use is for the production of silver powder for use in microelectronics. It is reduced with formaldehyde, producing silver free of alkali metals:

Ag_{2}CO_{3} + CH_{2}O → 2 Ag + 2 CO_{2} + H_{2}

Silver carbonate is also used as a reagent in organic synthesis such as the Koenigs-Knorr reaction. In the Fétizon oxidation, silver carbonate on celite acts as an oxidising agent to form lactones from diols. It is also employed to convert alkyl bromides into alcohols.

Silver fulminate, AgCNO, a powerful, touch-sensitive explosive used in percussion caps, is made by reaction of silver metal with nitric acid in the presence of ethanol. Other dangerously explosive silver compounds are silver azide, AgN_{3}, formed by reaction of silver nitrate with sodium azide, and silver acetylide, Ag_{2}C_{2}, formed when silver reacts with acetylene gas in ammonia solution. In its most characteristic reaction, silver azide decomposes explosively, releasing nitrogen gas: given the photosensitivity of silver salts, this behaviour may be induced by shining a light on its crystals.

2 AgN_{3} (s) → 3 N_{2} (g) + 2 Ag (s)

== Coordination compounds ==
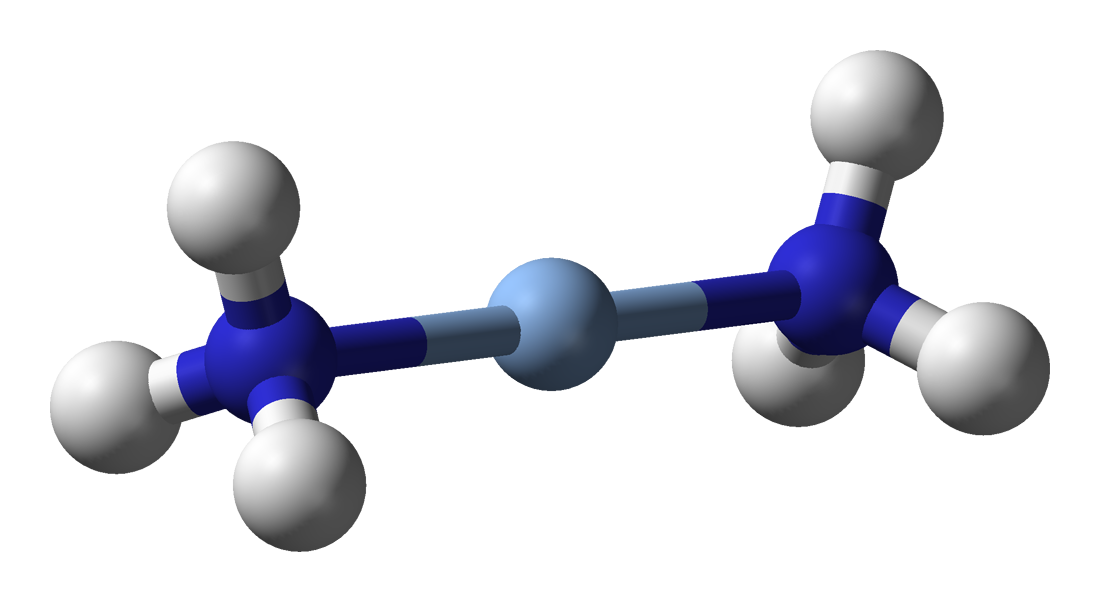
Structure of the diamminesilver(I) complex, [Ag(NH_{3})_{2}]^{+}

Silver complexes tend to be similar to those of its lighter homologue copper. Silver(III) complexes tend to be rare and very easily reduced to the more stable lower oxidation states, though they are slightly more stable than those of copper(III). For instance, the square planar periodate [Ag(IO_{5}OH)_{2}]^{5−} and tellurate [Ag{TeO_{4}(OH)_{2}}_{2}]^{5−} complexes may be prepared by oxidising silver(I) with alkaline peroxodisulfate. The yellow diamagnetic [AgF_{4}]^{−} is much less stable, fuming in moist air and reacting with glass.

Silver(II) complexes are more common. Like the valence isoelectronic copper(II) complexes, they are usually square planar and paramagnetic, which is increased by the greater field splitting for 4d electrons than for 3d electrons. Aqueous Ag^{2+}, produced by oxidation of Ag^{+} by ozone, is a very strong oxidising agent, even in acidic solutions: it is stabilized in phosphoric acid due to complex formation. Peroxodisulfate oxidation is generally necessary to give the more stable complexes with heterocyclic amines, such as [Ag(py)_{4}]^{2+} and [Ag(bipy)_{2}]^{2+}: these are stable provided the counterion cannot reduce the silver back to the +1 oxidation state. [AgF_{4}]^{2−} is also known in its violet barium salt, as are some silver(II) complexes with N- or O-donor ligands such as pyridine carboxylates.

By far the most important oxidation state for silver in complexes is +1. The Ag^{+} cation is diamagnetic, like its homologues Cu^{+} and Au^{+}, as all three have closed-shell electron configurations with no unpaired electrons: its complexes are colourless provided the ligands are not too easily polarized such as I^{−}. Ag^{+} forms salts with most anions, but it is reluctant to coordinate to oxygen and thus most of these salts are insoluble in water: the exceptions are the nitrate, perchlorate, and fluoride. The tetracoordinate tetrahedral aqueous ion [Ag(H_{2}O)_{4}]^{+} is known, but the characteristic geometry for the Ag^{+} cation is 2-coordinate linear. For example, silver chloride dissolves readily in excess aqueous ammonia to form [Ag(NH_{3})_{2}]^{+}; silver salts are dissolved in photography due to the formation of the thiosulfate complex [Ag(S_{2}O_{3})_{2}]^{3−}; and cyanide extraction for silver (and gold) works by the formation of the complex [Ag(CN)_{2}]^{−}. Silver cyanide forms the linear polymer {Ag–C≡N→Ag–C≡N→}; silver thiocyanate has a similar structure, but forms a zigzag instead because of the sp^{3}-hybridized sulfur atom. Chelating ligands are unable to form linear complexes and thus silver(I) complexes with them tend to form polymers; a few exceptions exist, such as the near-tetrahedral diphosphine and diarsine complexes [Ag(L–L)_{2}]^{+}.

== Organometallic compounds ==
Under standard conditions, silver does not form simple carbonyls, due to the weakness of the Ag–C bond. At cryogenic temperatures, fragile complexes with 1‑3 CO ligands form.

Polymeric AgLX complexes with alkenes and alkynes are known, but their bonds are thermodynamically weaker than even those of the platinum complexes (though they are formed more readily than those of the analogous gold complexes): they are also quite unsymmetrical, showing the weak π bonding in group 11. Ag–C σ bonds may also be formed by silver(I), like copper(I) and gold(I), but the simple alkyls and aryls of silver(I) are even less stable than those of copper(I) (which tend to explode under ambient conditions). For example, poor thermal stability is reflected in the relative decomposition temperatures of AgMe (−50 °C) and CuMe (−15 °C) as well as those of PhAg (74 °C) and PhCu (100 °C).

The C–Ag bond is stabilized by perfluoroalkyl ligands, for example in AgCF(CF_{3})_{2}. Alkenylsilver compounds are also more stable than their alkylsilver counterparts. Silver-NHC complexes are easily prepared, and are commonly used to prepare other NHC complexes by displacing labile ligands. For example, the reaction of the bis(NHC)silver(I) complex with bis(acetonitrile)palladium dichloride or chlorido(dimethyl sulfide)gold(I):

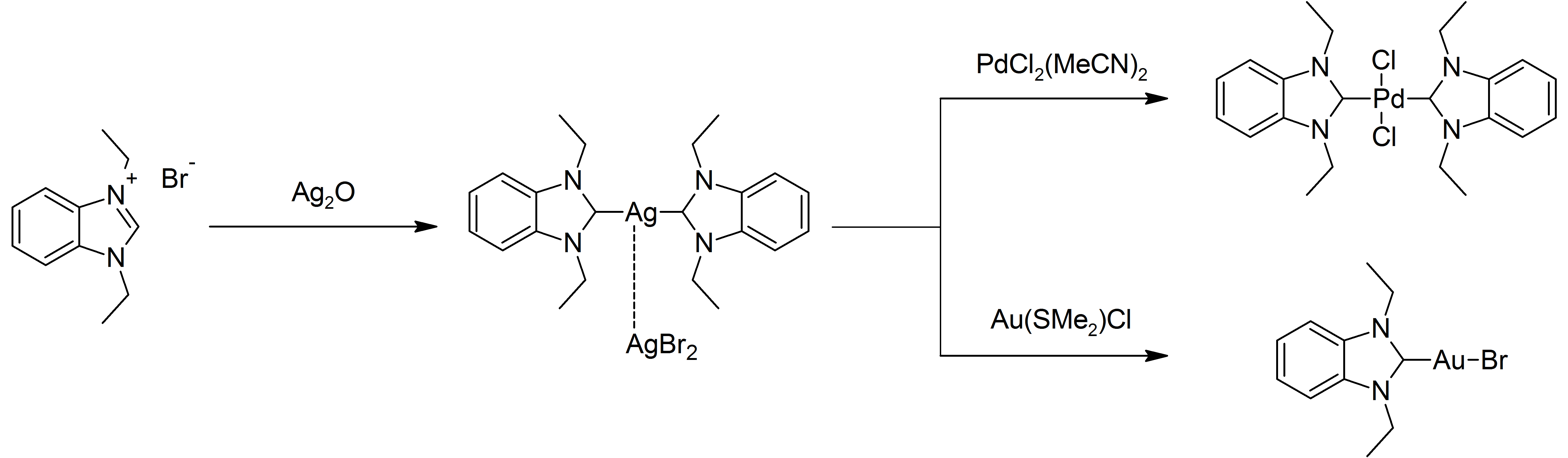

== Intermetallic compounds ==
Different colors of silver–copper–gold alloys

Silver forms alloys with most other elements on the periodic table. The elements from groups 1–3, except for hydrogen, lithium, and beryllium, are very miscible with silver in the condensed phase and form intermetallic compounds; those from groups 4–9 are only poorly miscible; the elements in groups 10–14 (except boron and carbon) have very complex Ag–M phase diagrams and form the most commercially important alloys; and the remaining elements on the periodic table have no consistency in their Ag–M phase diagrams. By far the most important such alloys are those with copper: most silver used for coinage and jewellery is in reality a silver–copper alloy, and the eutectic mixture is used in vacuum brazing. The two metals are completely miscible as liquids but not as solids; their importance in industry comes from the fact that their properties tend to be suitable over a wide range of variation in silver and copper concentration, although most useful alloys tend to be richer in silver than the eutectic mixture (71.9% silver and 28.1% copper by weight, and 60.1% silver and 39.9% copper by atom).

Most other binary alloys are of little use: for example, silver–gold alloys are too soft and silver–cadmium alloys too toxic. Ternary alloys have much greater importance: dental amalgams are usually silver–tin–mercury alloys, silver–copper–gold alloys are very important in jewellery (usually on the gold-rich side) and have a vast range of hardnesses and colours, silver–copper–zinc alloys are useful as low-melting brazing alloys, and silver–cadmium–indium (involving three adjacent elements on the periodic table) is useful in nuclear reactors because of its high thermal neutron capture cross-section, good conduction of heat, mechanical stability, and resistance to corrosion in hot water.

== See also ==
- Copper compounds
- Gold compounds
