= Gold(I) chloride =

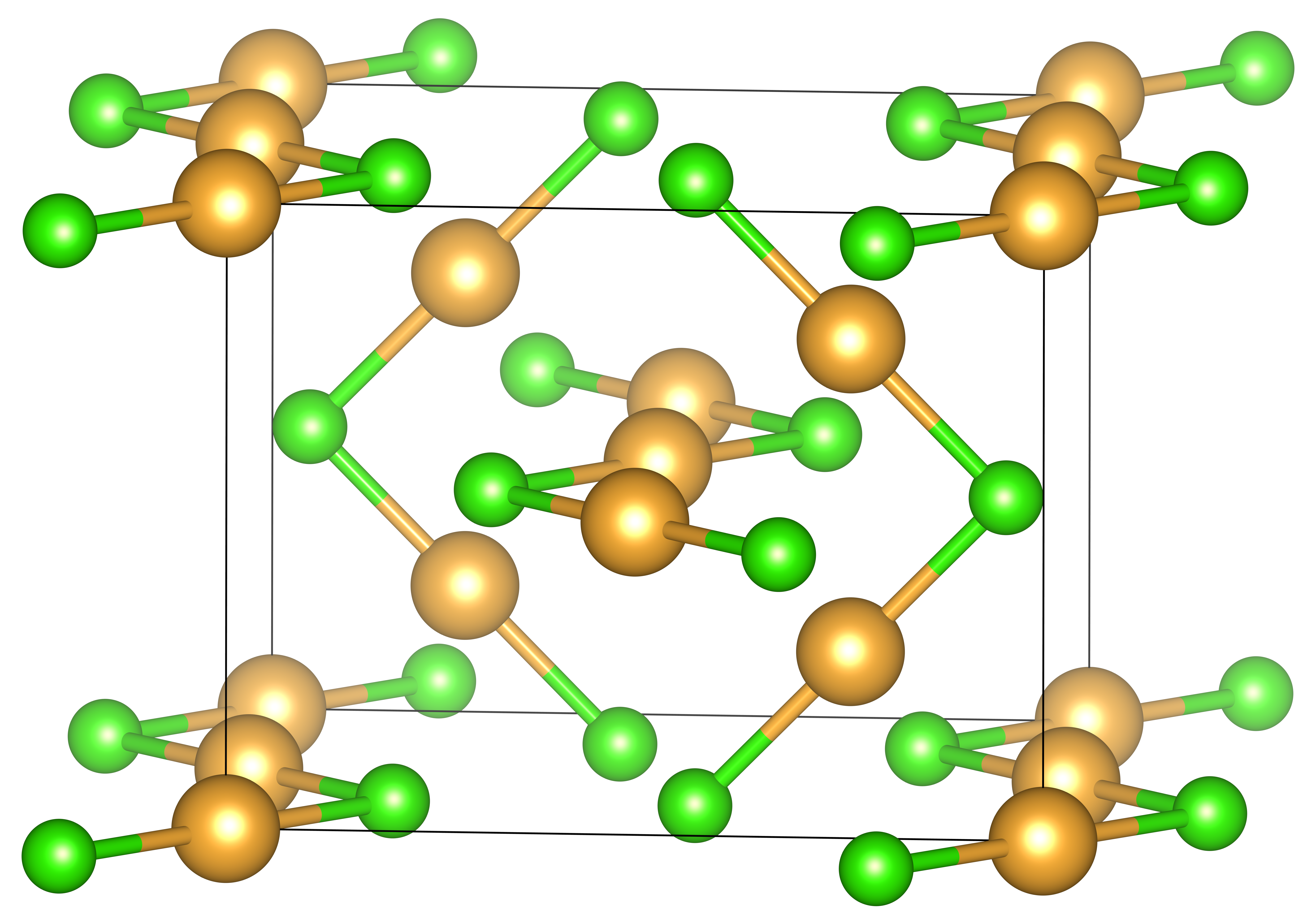

Names
- IUPAC name Gold(I) chloride
- Other names Aurous chloride

Identifiers
CAS Number	10294-29-8
3D model (JSmol)	Interactive image
ChEBI	CHEBI:30078
ChemSpider	25464
ECHA InfoCard	100.030.583
PubChem CID	27366
UNII	JD7Y972WU9
CompTox Dashboard (EPA)	DTXSID4065026
- InChI: InChI=1S/Au.ClH/h;1H/q+1;/p-1 Key: FDWREHZXQUYJFJ-UHFFFAOYSA-M; InChI=1/Au.ClH/h;1H/q+1;/p-1 Key: FDWREHZXQUYJFJ-REWHXWOFAM
- SMILES: [Au]Cl

Properties
Chemical formula	AuCl
Molar mass	232.423 g/mol
Appearance	yellow solid
Density	7.6 g/cm^{3}
Melting point	210 °C (410 °F; 483 K) (decomposition)
Solubility in water	Insoluble (cold water); Reacts (warm water)
Solubility	Soluble in HCl, HBr organic solvents
Magnetic susceptibility (χ)	−67.0·10^{−6} cm^{3}/mol

Structure
Crystal structure	Tetragonal, tI16
Space group	I4_{1}/amd, No. 141
Lattice constant	a = 6.734 Å, c = 8.674 Å

Thermochemistry
Std enthalpy of formation (Δ_{f}H^{⦵}_{298})	–34.7 kJ/mol

Hazards
- GHS labelling
Pictograms	(GHS05: Corrosive) (GHS07: Exclamation mark)
Signal word	Danger
Hazard statements	H314, H317
NFPA 704 (fire diamond)	3 1 0
Safety data sheet (SDS)	MSDS (Fisher)

Related compounds
Other anions	Gold(I) fluoride Gold(I) bromide Gold(I) iodide
Other cations	Copper(I) chloride Silver chloride
Related compounds	Gold(I,III) chloride Gold(III) chloride
- Except where otherwise noted, data are given for materials in their standard state (at 25 °C [77 °F], 100 kPa). verify (what is ?) Infobox references

Gold(I) chloride is a compound of gold and chlorine with the chemical formula AuCl. It is a metastable yellow solid that hydrolyses in warm water and decomposes to gold and chlorine gas at elevated temperatures. It has limited uses in organic chemistry as a Lewis acid.

== History ==
Gold(I) chloride was first reported by Louis Jacques Thénard in 1814, who had carefully heated gold(III) chloride and isolated a yellow solid, claiming that it was the proto-muriate of gold. Joseph Proust disputed his claim, along with Thénard's other erroneous claims, such as of gold(I) oxide, later in the year. However, gold(I) chloride was found to be a distinct compound from gold(III) chloride, as the synthesis was repeated by others, such as Hans Peter Jørgen Julius Thomsen. The structure was elucidated in 1974 by X-ray diffraction.

== Preparation ==
A modern synthesis entails the decomposition of gold(III) chloride under a chlorine atmosphere at 247 °C:

AuCl_{3} → AuCl + Cl_{2}

Gold(III) chloride can also be heated in air at 185 °C to produce gold(I) chloride with careful temperature control.

== Structure ==
The structure of gold(I) chloride, which crystallizes in the tetragonal crystal system, consists of zig-zag chains of gold and chlorine, similar to gold(I) bromide and gold(I) iodide. The Au-Cl bond length is 2.36 Å, and the chain bends at the Cl with a bond angle of 92°.

== Reactions ==
Gold(I) chloride decomposes to gold metal and chlorine gas at around 210 °C:

2AuCl → 2Au + Cl_{2}

Although a region of stability exists at higher temperatures and appropriate chlorine vapour pressures (254 to 282 °C at P_{Cl_{2}} = 1 atm), the compound remains metastable at ambient conditions. In warm water, the compound dispropotionates to metallic gold and gold(III) chloride in an autoredox reaction:

3 AuCl → 2 Au + AuCl_{3}

At still higher temperatures, around 500 °C, all gold chlorides convert to gold even under a chlorine atmosphere. This conversion is key to the Miller process, which is widely used for the purification of gold.

In hydrochloric acid, gold(I) chloride dissolves to form the colorless dichloroaurate(I) (AuCl_{2}^{–}) ion. At higher pH, this complex hydrolyses to gold(I)-hydroxo complexes and disproportionates to gold and gold(III). However, the salts of the dichloroaurate(I) ion, such as the tetrabutylammonium salt, are prepared from the respective tetrachloroaurate(III) ion instead from gold(I) chloride.

Reaction with potassium bromide yields potassium auric bromide and potassium chloride with separation of metallic gold:

3 AuCl + 4 KBr → KAuBr_{4} + 2 Au + 3 KCl

Carbon monoxide reduces gold(I) chloride at 110 °C to form phosgene:

2AuCl + CO → 2Au + COCl_{2}

However, under benzene, it forms carbonylchlorogold(I) (COAuCl) instead.

=== Organogold(I) complexes ===
Various gold(I) chloride complexes are known, such as Ph_{3}PAuCl and Me_{2}SAuCl. However, the synthesis of these does not utilize gold(I) chloride, but instead goes through a direct reduction from Au(III) in the presence of the ligand. These complexes are the major gateways to other organogold(I) complexes.

== Applications ==
Gold(I) chloride mostly only has applications in organogold catalyzed organic reactions. It is used as a Lewis acid to activate alkenes, alkynes, and allenes. For example, acetylenic acids cycloisomerize in the presence of gold(I) chloride:

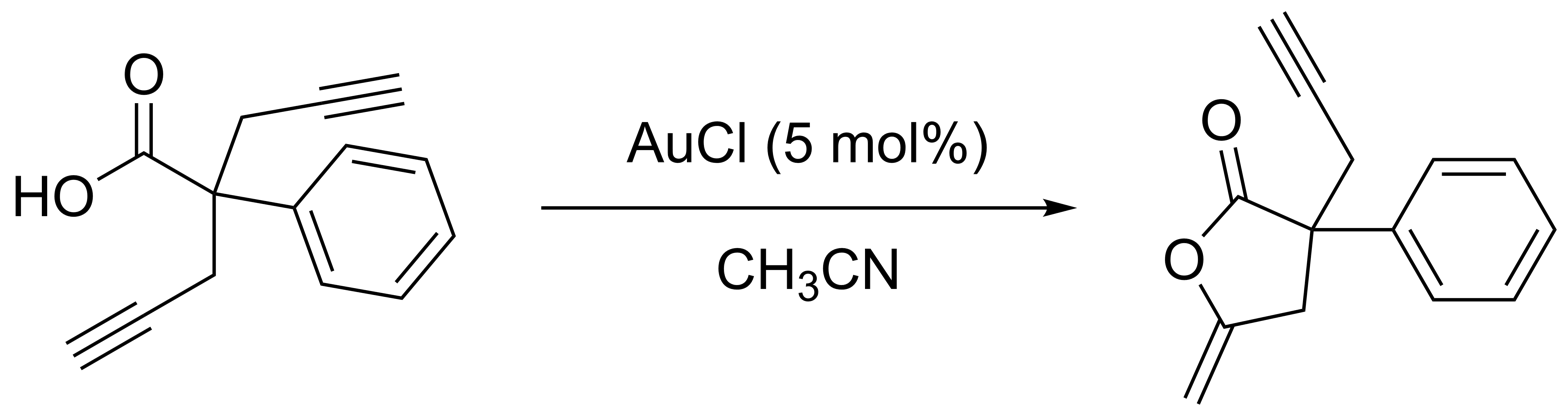

== Safety ==
Generally, gold(I) compounds are less toxic than gold(III) compounds. However, gold(I) chloride is a skin sensitizer that may irritate the skin and eyes.
