= Gold(III) iodide =

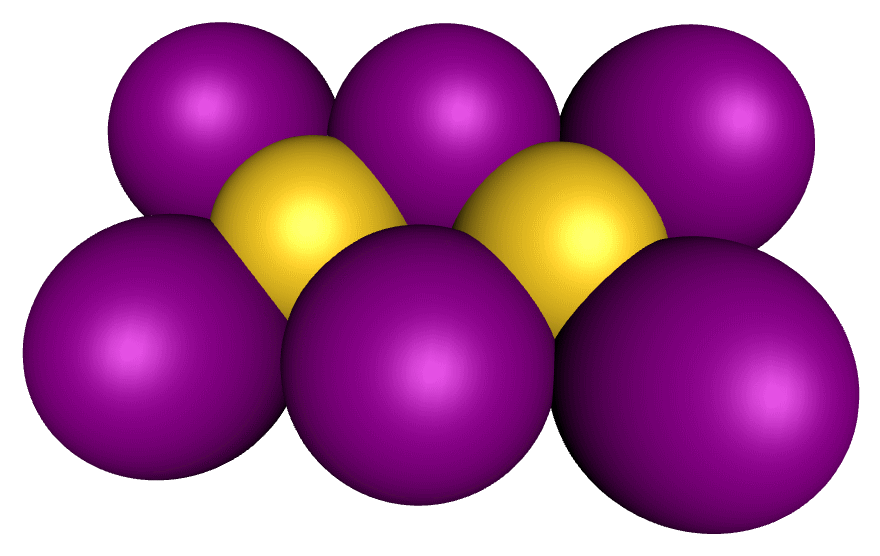

Names
- Systematic IUPAC name Gold(III) iodide
- Other names Auric iodide Gold iodide Digold hexaiodide

Identifiers
CAS Number	13453-24-2
3D model (JSmol)	Interactive image
ChemSpider	4896046
ECHA InfoCard	100.033.281
PubChem CID	3691217
CompTox Dashboard (EPA)	DTXSID80928657
- InChI: InChI=1S/Au.3HI/h;3*1H/q+3;;;/p-3 Key: GCZKMPJFYKFENV-UHFFFAOYSA-K
- SMILES: I[Au](I)I

Properties
Chemical formula	AuI_{3}
Molar mass	577.67998 g·mol^{−1}
- Except where otherwise noted, data are given for materials in their standard state (at 25 °C [77 °F], 100 kPa). Infobox references

Gold iodide is a hypothetical chemical compound with the formula AuI_{3}. Although Au_{2}I_{6} is predicted to be stable, gold(III) iodide remains an example of a nonexistent or unstable compound. Attempts to isolate pure samples result in the formation of gold(I) iodide and iodine:

AuI_{3} → AuI + I_{2}
