= Gold(III) chloride (data page) =

Chemical data page

This page provides supplementary chemical data on gold(III) chloride

== Thermodynamic properties ==
Phase behavior
Triple point	? K (? °C), ? Pa
Critical point	? K (? °C), ? Pa
Std enthalpy change of fusionΔ_{fus}H^{~~o~~}	? kJ/mol
Std entropy change of fusionΔ_{fus}S^{~~o~~}	? J/(mol·K)
Std enthalpy change of vaporizationΔ_{vap}H^{~~o~~}	? kJ/mol
Std entropy change of vaporizationΔ_{vap}S^{~~o~~}	? J/(mol·K)
Solid properties
Std enthalpy change of formation Δ_{f}H^{~~o~~}_{solid}	−118 kJ/mol
Standard molar entropy S^{~~o~~}_{solid}	? J/(mol K)
Heat capacity c_{p}	? J/(mol K)
Liquid properties
Std enthalpy change of formation Δ_{f}H^{~~o~~}_{liquid}	? kJ/mol
Standard molar entropy S^{~~o~~}_{liquid}	? J/(mol K)
Heat capacity c_{p}	? J/(mol K)
Gas properties
Std enthalpy change of formation Δ_{f}H^{~~o~~}_{gas}	? kJ/mol
Standard molar entropy S^{~~o~~}_{gas}	? J/(mol K)
Heat capacity c_{p}	? J/(mol K)

== Spectral data ==
UV-Vis
Lambda-max	? nm
Extinction coefficient	?
IR
Major absorption bands	? cm^{−1}
NMR
Proton NMR
Carbon-13 NMR
Other NMR data
MS
Masses of main fragments

== Structure and properties data ==
Structure and properties
Index of refraction	?
Dielectric constant	? C^{2}/(N·m^{2}) at ? °C
Bond strength	?
Bond length	224 pm (Outer Au-Cl) 234 pm (Bridging Au-Cl)
Bond angle	90° (Outer Cl-Au-Cl); 86° (Bridging Cl-Au-Cl)
Magnetic susceptibility	−112 cgs units

== Material Safety Data Sheet ==
The handling of this chemical may incur notable safety precautions. It is highly recommend that you seek the Material Safety Datasheet (MSDS) for this chemical from a reliable source such as SIRI, and follow its directions.

This box:
- Except where noted otherwise, data relate to Standard temperature and pressure.
- Reliability of data general note.
