= (2,4,6-Trimethylphenyl)gold =

- Crystal structure of (2,4,6-trimethylphenyl)gold Pentameric form

Names
- IUPAC name (2,4,6-Trimethylphenyl)gold
- Other names Mesitylgold; Mesitylgold(I); (2,4,6-Trimethylphenyl)gold(I)

Identifiers
| CAS Number | 89359-21-7 monomer; 89340-02-3 pentamer |
| 3D model (JSmol) | monomer: Interactive image; pentamer: Interactive image |
| ChemSpider | 14451398 |
| PubChem CID | 19877937 |
| CompTox Dashboard (EPA) | DTXSID70600915 |
- InChI: InChI=1S/C9H11.Au/c1-7-4-8(2)6-9(3)5-7;/h4-5H,1-3H3; Key: VUMCLWYYCJSHBH-UHFFFAOYSA-N
- SMILES: monomer: CC1=CC(C)=C([Au])C(C)=C1; pentamer: [Au+]1[C-]2(=C(C)C=C(C)C=C2(C))[Au+][C-]3(=C(C)C=C(C)C=C3(C))[Au+][C-]4(=C(C)C=C(C)C=C4(C))[Au+][C-]5(=C(C)C=C(C)C=C5(C))[Au+][C-]16(=C(C)C=C(C)C=C6(C))

Properties
| Chemical formula | AuC_{9}H_{11} |
| Molar mass | 316.15 g mol^{−1} |
- Except where otherwise noted, data are given for materials in their standard state (at 25 °C [77 °F], 100 kPa). verify (what is ?) Infobox references

(2,4,6-Trimethylphenyl)gold is a member of a special group of compounds where an aryl carbon atom acts as a bridge between two gold atoms. This compound is formed in a reaction between Au(CO)Cl and the Grignard reagent mesitylmagnesium bromide. It crystallizes as a cyclical pentamer.
