= Gold(I) bromide =

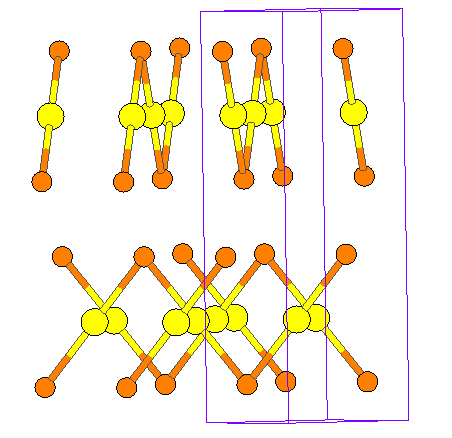
- Crystal structure of AuBr-P

Names
- IUPAC name gold(I) bromide
- Other names Aurous bromide Gold monobromide Gold(I) bromide

Identifiers
CAS Number	10294-27-6
3D model (JSmol)	Interactive image
ChemSpider	30968
EC Number	260-763-2
PubChem CID	33567
UNII	R3HJY6LTW8
CompTox Dashboard (EPA)	DTXSID40275053
- InChI: InChI=1S/Au.BrH/h;1H/q+1;/p-1 Key: PMCMJPXEJUKOAO-UHFFFAOYSA-M
- SMILES: Br[Au]

Properties
Chemical formula	AuBr
Molar mass	276.87 g/mol
Appearance	lemon yellow crystals (AuBr-I), yellow-brown (AuBr-P)
Density	7.9 g/cm^{3}
Melting point	165 °C (329 °F; 438 K) (decomposes)
Magnetic susceptibility (χ)	−61.0·10^{−6} cm^{3}/mol

Hazards
NFPA 704 (fire diamond)	3
- Except where otherwise noted, data are given for materials in their standard state (at 25 °C [77 °F], 100 kPa). verify (what is ?) Infobox references

Gold(I) bromide can be formed by synthesis from the elements or partial decomposition of gold(III) bromide by careful control of temperatures and pressures.

== Structure ==
It occurs in two modifications. One (I-AuBr) is isostructural with gold(I) chloride and has a body centered tetragonal unit cell with a = 6.734 Å, c = 8.674 Å, and space group I4_{1}/amd. The other (P-AuBr) is isostructural with gold(I) iodide and has a primitive tetragonal cell a = 4.296 Å, c = 12.146 Å, and space group P4_{2}/ncm. Single crystals of both modifications have been grown by chemical vapor transport. Small amounts of aluminium, gallium, or iron were used as catalysts for the transport process to obtain the I-AuBr modification.

The two structures both consist of -Br-Au-Br-Au-Br- polymeric zigzag chains, but they are stacked in a different arrangement. In the primitive tetragonal I-AuBr, the chains form layers (see figure) in contrast to the body centered P-AuBr, where they are more interwoven. Another difference is that the Au-Br-Au angle is only 77° in the former, but 92.3° in the latter.

Density functional calculations on the monohalides of group 11 (Cu, Ag, Au) have tried to shed light on the question why gold halides form rather different, low symmetry structures rather than the cubic zinc blend or rock salt structures of the silver and copper halides. It was shown that this calculation technique accurately predicts which structure type should be stable. The peculiar structures of the gold halides are mostly a result of the relativistic effects that occur for the elements of the later periods of the periodic table.
