= Chloro(triphenylphosphine)gold(I) =

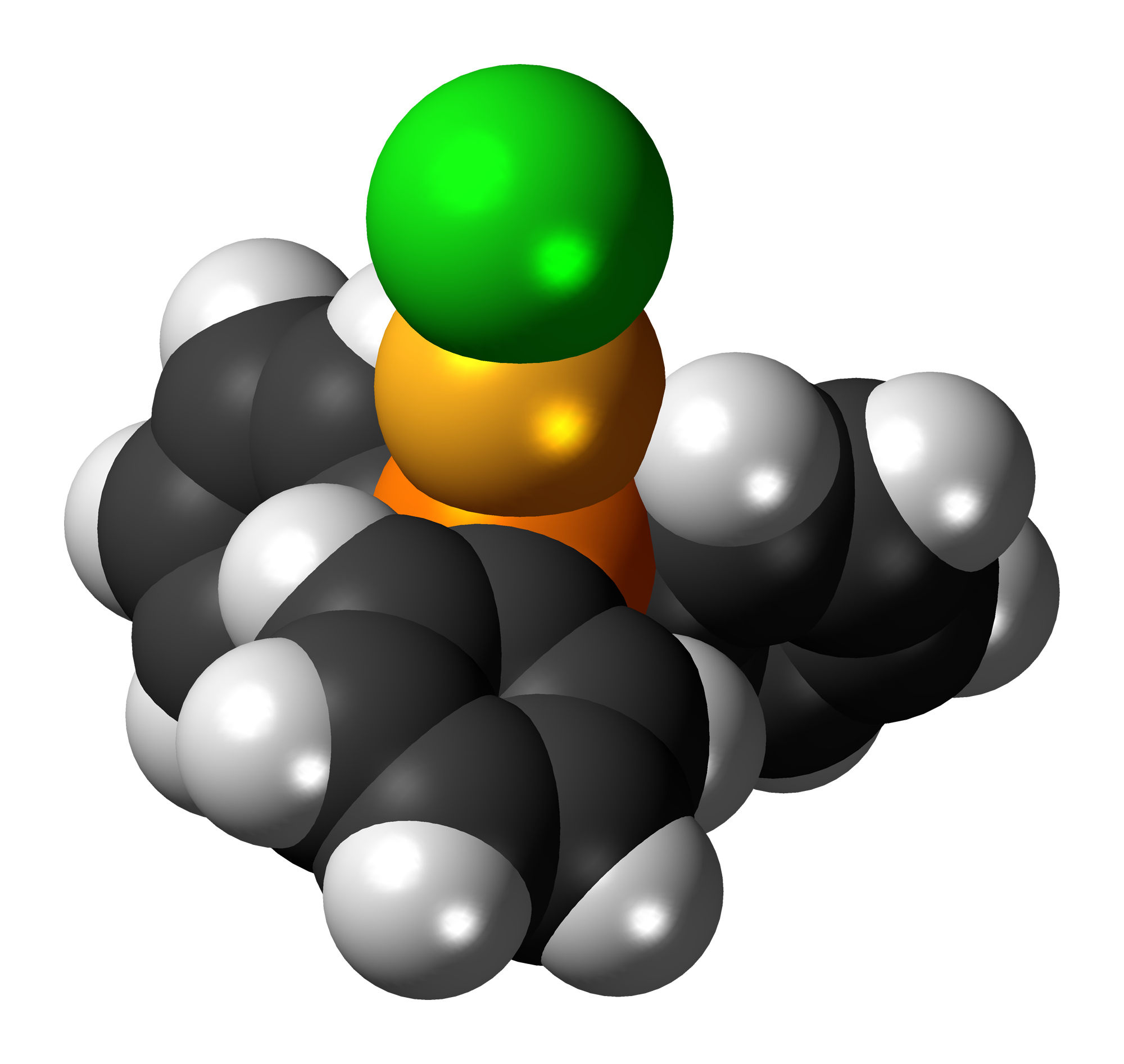

Identifiers
CAS Number	14243-64-2
3D model (JSmol)	separate form: Interactive image; coordination form: Interactive image
ChemSpider	62872670
ECHA InfoCard	100.034.636
EC Number	238-117-6
PubChem CID	10874691
UNII	3RF78267UX
CompTox Dashboard (EPA)	DTXSID40931445
- InChI: InChI=1S/C18H15P.Au.ClH/c1-4-10-16(11-5-1)19(17-12-6-2-7-13-17)18-14-8-3-9-15-18;;/h1-15H;;1H/q;+1;/p-1 Key: IFPWCRBNZXUWGC-UHFFFAOYSA-M
- SMILES: separate form: C1=CC=C(C=C1)P(C2=CC=CC=C2)C3=CC=CC=C3.Cl[Au]; coordination form: Cl[Au-][P+](c0ccccc0)(c0ccccc0)c0ccccc0

Properties
Chemical formula	C_{18}H_{15}AuClP
Molar mass	494.71 g·mol^{−1}
Appearance	Colorless solid
Density	1.97 g/cm^{3}
Melting point	236–237 °C (457–459 °F; 509–510 K)

Hazards
- GHS labelling
Pictograms	(GHS07: Exclamation mark)
Signal word	Warning
Hazard statements	H315, H319, H335
Precautionary statements	P261, P264, P271, P280, P302+P352, P304+P340, P305+P351+P338, P312, P321, P332+P313, P337+P313, P362, P403+P233, P405, P501
- Except where otherwise noted, data are given for materials in their standard state (at 25 °C [77 °F], 100 kPa). verify (what is ?) Infobox references

Chloro(triphenylphosphine)gold(I) or triphenylphosphinegold(I) chloride is a coordination complex with the formula (Ph_{3}P)AuCl. This colorless solid is a common reagent for research on gold compounds.

== Preparation and structure ==
The complex is prepared by reducing chloroauric acid with triphenylphosphine in 95% ethanol:

HAuCl_{4} + H_{2}O + 2 PPh_{3} → (Ph_{3}P)AuCl + Ph_{3}PO + 3 HCl (Ph = phenyl, C_{6}H_{5})

Chloro(triphenylphosphine)gold(I) can also be prepared by treating (dimethyl sulfide)gold(I) chloride (((CH_{3})_{2}S)AuCl) with triphenylphosphine.

The complex adopts a linear coordination geometry, which is typical of most gold(I) compounds. It crystallizes in the orthorhombic space group P2_{1}2_{1}2_{1} with a = 12.300(4) Å, b = 13.084(4) Å, c = 10.170(3) Å with Z = 4 formula units per unit cell.

== Reactivity ==
Triphenylphosphinegold(I) chloride is a precursor to gold(I) catalyst used in organic synthesis. Typically, it is treated with silver(I) salts of weakly coordinating anions (e.g., X^{–} = SbF_{6}^{–}, BF_{4}^{–}, TfO^{–}, or Tf_{2}N^{–}) to generate a weakly bound Ph_{3}PAu–X complex. Among these, only the bistriflimide complex Ph_{3}PAuNTf_{2} can be purified. The nitrate complex Ph_{3}PAuONO_{2} and the oxonium species [(Ph_{3}PAu)_{3}O]^{+}[BF_{4}]^{–} are also prepared from the chloride.

Triphenylphosphinegold(I) chloride is an entry reagent for organogold chemistry. The methyl complex Ph_{3}PAuMe is prepared from triphenylphosphinegold(I) chloride by transmetalation with a Grignard reagent. Further treatment of Ph_{3}PAuMe with methyllithium displaces the phosphine ligand and generates lithium dimethylaurate.

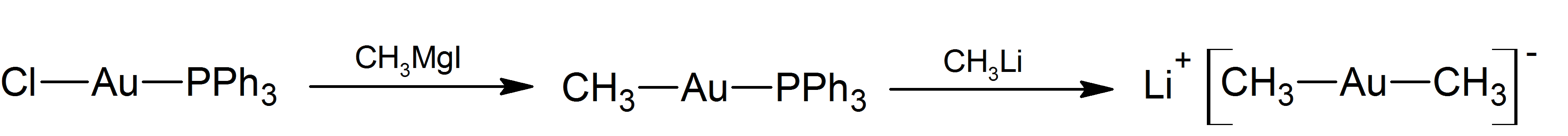
Methylation of triphenylphosphinegold(I) chloride.
