= Gold(III) fluoride =

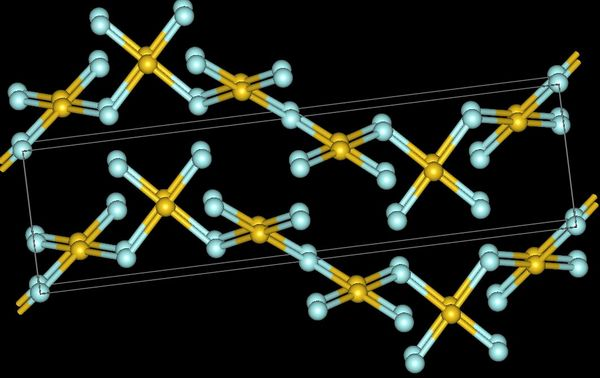

Names
- IUPAC name Gold(III) fluoride
- Other names Gold trifluoride Auric fluoride

Identifiers
CAS Number	14720-21-9
3D model (JSmol)	Interactive image
ChEBI	CHEBI:30077
ChemSpider	10790539
PubChem CID	5460532
CompTox Dashboard (EPA)	DTXSID10933057
- InChI: InChI=1S/Au.3FH/h;3*1H/q+3;;;/p-3 Key: NIXONLGLPJQPCW-UHFFFAOYSA-K; InChI=1/Au.3FH/h;3*1H/q+3;;;/p-3 Key: NIXONLGLPJQPCW-DFZHHIFOAD
- SMILES: [Au+3].[F-].[F-].[F-]

Properties
Chemical formula	AuF_{3}
Molar mass	253.961779 g·mol^{−1}
Appearance	orange-yellow hexagonal crystals
Density	6.75 g/cm^{3}
Melting point	sublimes above 300 °C
Solubility in water	Reacts
Magnetic susceptibility (χ)	+74·10^{−6} cm^{3}/mol

Structure
Crystal structure	Hexagonal, hP24
Space group	P6_{1}22, No. 178

Thermochemistry
Std enthalpy of formation (Δ_{f}H^{⦵}_{298})	−363.3 kJ/mol

Related compounds
Other anions	Gold(III) chloride Gold(III) bromide
Other cations	Silver fluoride Copper(II) fluoride Mercury(II) fluoride
- Except where otherwise noted, data are given for materials in their standard state (at 25 °C [77 °F], 100 kPa). verify (what is ?) Infobox references

Gold(III) fluoride is an inorganic compound of gold and fluorine with the molecular formula AuF_{3}. It is an orange solid that sublimes at 300 °C. It is a powerful fluorinating agent. It is very sensitive to moisture, yielding gold(III) hydroxide and hydrofluoric acid.

== Preparation ==
AuF_{3} can be prepared by reacting AuCl_{3} with F_{2} or BrF_{3}.

== Structure ==
The crystal structure of AuF_{3} consists of spirals of square-planar AuF_{4} units.

AuF_{3} unit cell	neighbouring (AuF_{3})_{n} helices	distorted octahedral coordination of gold by six fluorines	top-down view of an (AuF_{3})_{n} helix	side view of an (AuF_{3})_{n} helix
