= Gold(I,III) chloride =

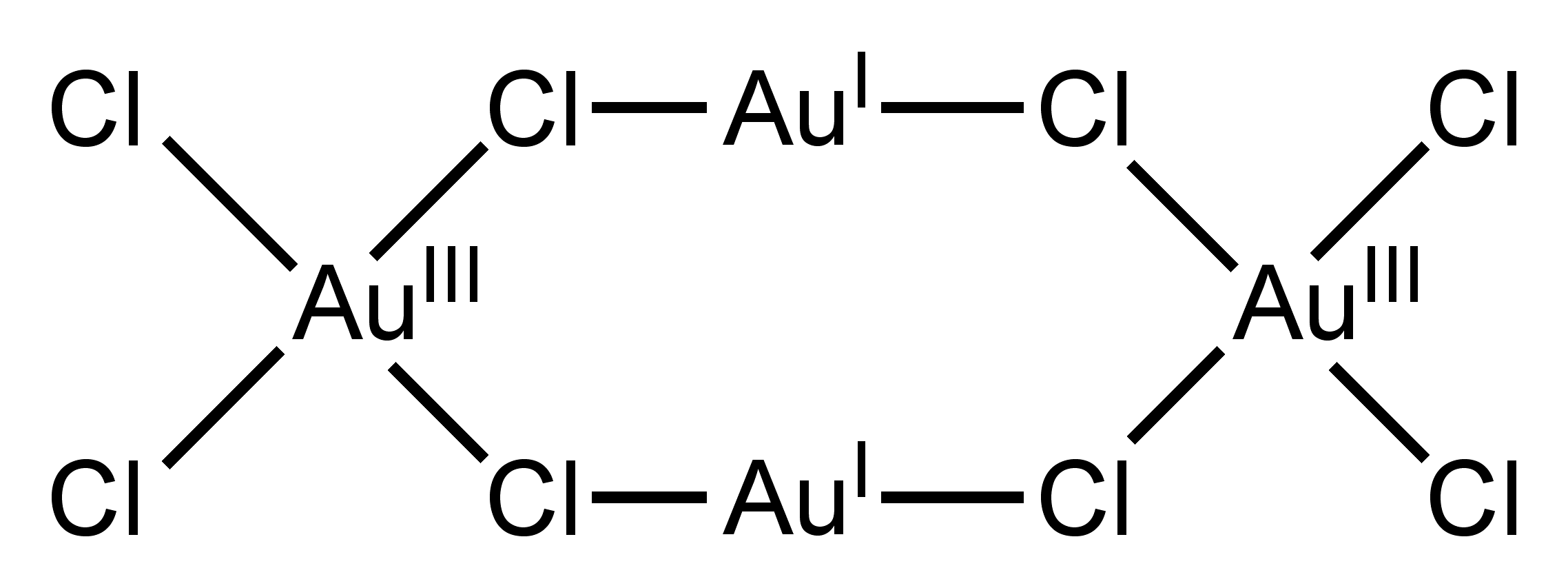
- Skeletal formula of gold(I,III) chloride with implicit oxidation states shown

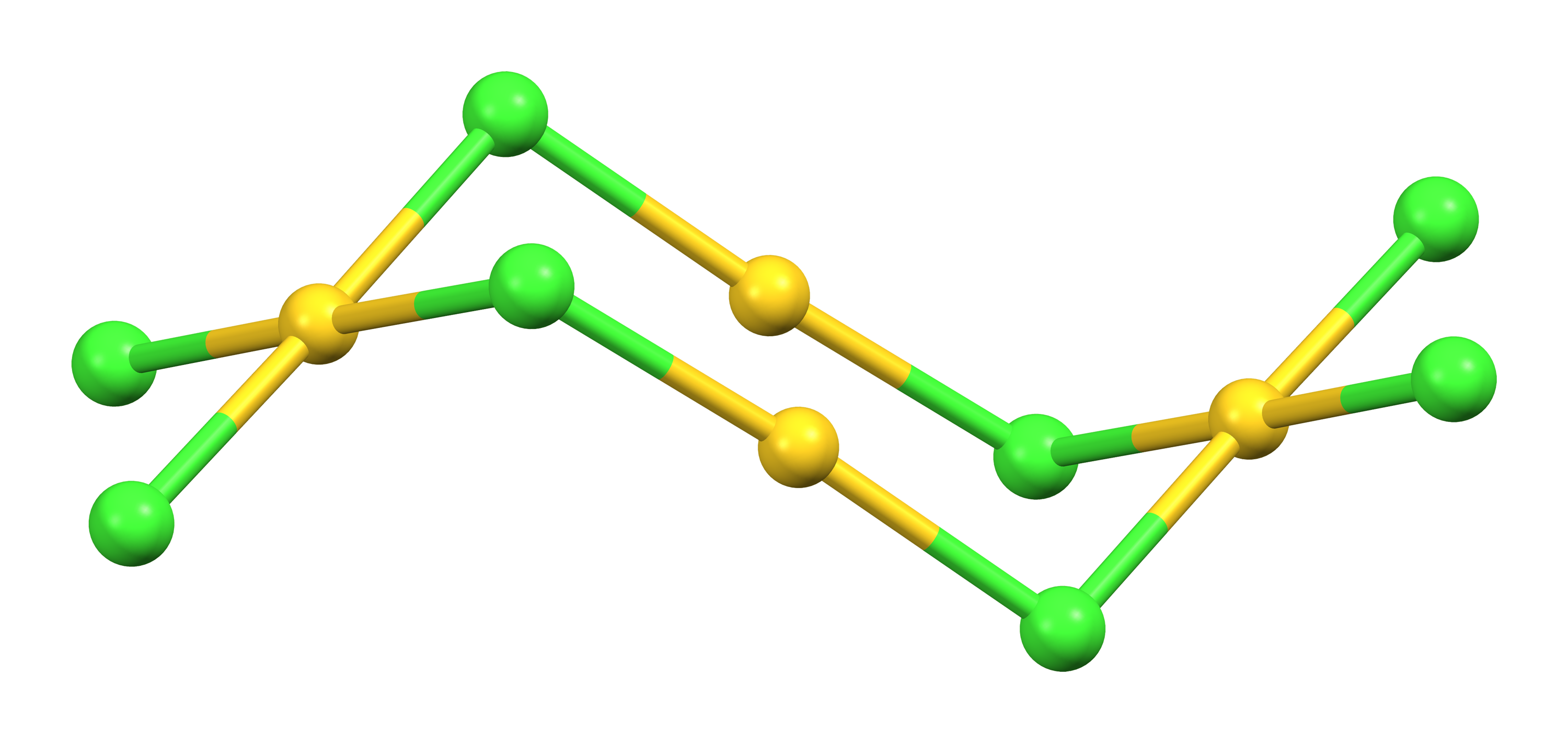

Names
- Systematic IUPAC name tetra-μ-chlorotetrachlorotetragold
- Other names Mixed gold chloride, Tetragold octachloride

Identifiers
CAS Number	62792-24-9
3D model (JSmol)	Interactive image; Interactive image
PubChem CID	139092506
- InChI: InChI=1S/4Au.4ClH.4Cl/h;;;;4*1H;;;;/q;;2*+2;;;;;;;;/p-4 Key: NWBJVUUFMJPGPV-UHFFFAOYSA-J
- SMILES: Cl[Au]1(Cl)[Cl][Au][Cl][Au](Cl)(Cl)[Cl][Au][Cl]1; [Cl-].[Cl-].[Cl-].[Cl-].[Cl-].[Cl-].[Cl-].[Cl-].[Au+].[Au+].[Au+3].[Au+3]

Properties
Chemical formula	Au_{4}Cl_{8}
Molar mass	1071.490 g mol^{−1}
Appearance	black crystals
- Except where otherwise noted, data are given for materials in their standard state (at 25 °C [77 °F], 100 kPa). verify (what is ?) Infobox references

Gold(I,III) chloride is the inorganic compound with the chemical formula Au_{4}Cl_{8}. It is a mixed valence compound as it contains gold in two oxidation states; square-planar gold(III) and almost linear gold(I). The compound, which is black, is photosensitive as well as air- and moisture-sensitive.

== Synthesis ==
According to the procedure by Calderazzo et al., gold(I,III) chloride may be prepared by the reaction of gold(III) chloride with gold carbonyl chloride or carbon monoxide at room temperature in thionyl chloride.

Au_{2}(CO)Cl_{4} + Au_{2}Cl_{6} → COCl_{2} + Au_{4}Cl_{8}

2 Au_{2}Cl_{6} + 2 CO → Au_{4}Cl_{8} + 2 COCl_{2}

== Structure and properties ==
Single crystals of gold(I,III) chloride are triclinic with a P1̅ space group and consist of discrete Au_{4}Cl_{8} molecules with idealised C_{2h} symmetry. Within this the Au(I) centers are linearly coordinated with a Cl-Au-Cl bond angle of 175.0° (close to the ideal value of 180°) and an average bond length of 2.30 Å (230 pm). The Au(III) centers adopt a slightly irregular square-planar conformation with the Au-Cl bond lengths for bridging chlorides (2.33 Å (233 pm)) being slightly longer than those of terminal chlorides (2.24 Å (224 pm)).
