= Gold(III) chloride =

Chemical compound

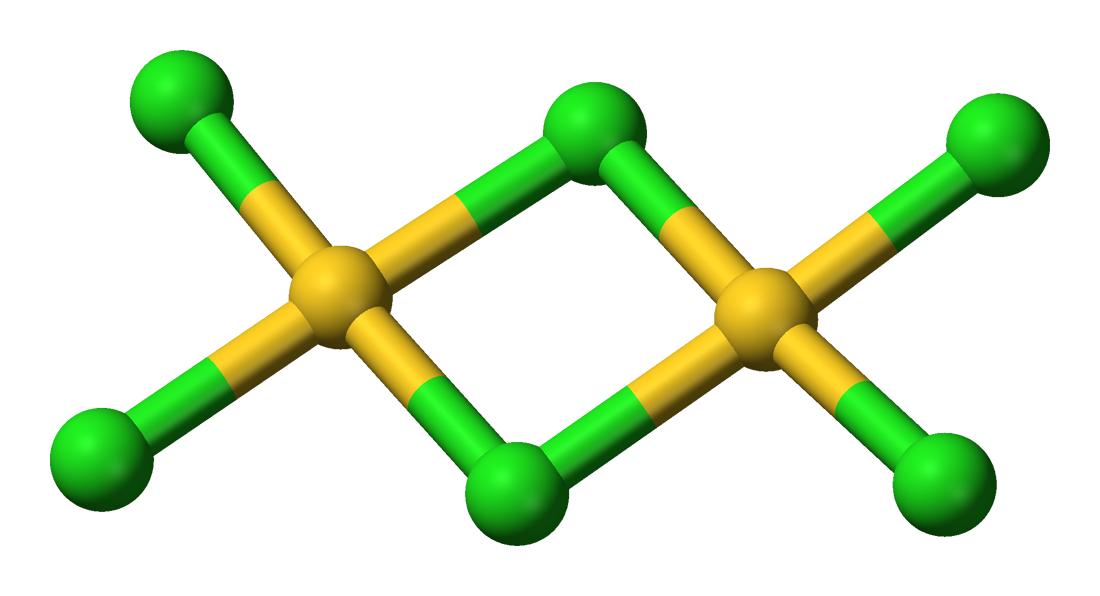
- Ball-and-stick model of AuCl_{3}

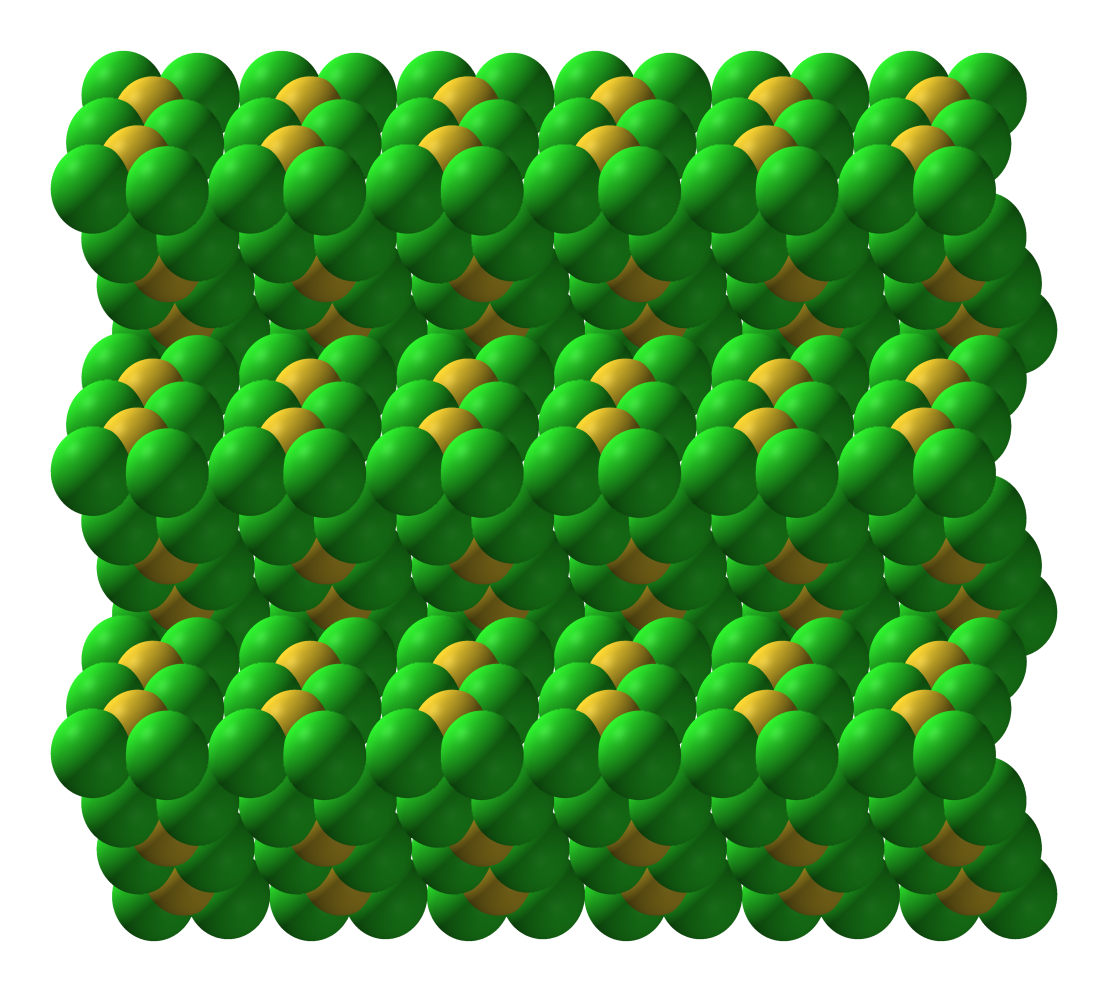
- Crystal structure of AuCl_{3}

Names
- IUPAC name Gold(III) trichloride
- Other names Auric chloride Gold trichloride

Identifiers
| CAS Number | 13453-07-1 |
| 3D model (JSmol) | Interactive image |
| ChEBI | CHEBI:30076 |
| ChemSpider | 24244 |
| ECHA InfoCard | 100.033.280 |
| PubChem CID | 26030 |
| RTECS number | MD5420000 |
| UNII | 15443PR153 |
| CompTox Dashboard (EPA) | DTXSID4044379 |
- InChI: InChI=1S/Au.3ClH/h;3*1H/q+3;;;/p-3 Key: RJHLTVSLYWWTEF-UHFFFAOYSA-K; InChI=1/Au.3ClH/h;3*1H/q+3;;;/p-3 Key: RJHLTVSLYWWTEF-DFZHHIFOAC
- SMILES: Cl[Au-]1(Cl)[Cl+][Au-]([Cl+]1)(Cl)Cl

Properties
| Chemical formula | AuCl_{3} (exists as Au_{2}Cl_{6}) |
| Molar mass | 606.6511 g/mol (for Au_{2}Cl_{6}) |
| Appearance | Red crystals (anhydrous); golden, yellow crystals (monohydrate) |
| Density | 4.7 g/cm^{3} |
| Melting point | 160 °C (320 °F; 433 K) (decomposes) |
| Solubility in water | 68 g/100 ml (20 °C) |
| Solubility | soluble in ether and ethanol, slightly soluble in liquid ammonia, insoluble in benzene |
| Magnetic susceptibility (χ) | −112·10^{−6} cm^{3}/mol |

Structure
| Crystal structure | monoclinic |
| Space group | P2_{1}/C |
| Lattice constant | a = 6.57 Å, b = 11.04 Å, c = 6.44 Å α = 90°, β = 113.3°, γ = 90° |
| Coordination geometry | Square planar |

Thermochemistry
| Std enthalpy of formation (Δ_{f}H^{⦵}_{298}) | −117.6 kJ/mol |

Hazards
- Occupational safety and health (OHS/OSH)
| Main hazards | Irritant |
- GHS labelling
| Pictograms | (GHS07: Exclamation mark) |
| Signal word | Warning |
| Hazard statements | H315, H319, H335 |
| Precautionary statements | P261, P264, P271, P280, P302+P352, P305+P351+P338 |

Related compounds
| Other anions | Gold(III) fluoride Gold(III) bromide |
| Other cations | Gold(I) chloride Silver(I) chloride Platinum(II) chloride Mercury(II) chloride |

Supplementary data page
- Gold(III) chloride (data page)
- Except where otherwise noted, data are given for materials in their standard state (at 25 °C [77 °F], 100 kPa). verify (what is ?) Infobox references

Gold(III) chloride, traditionally called auric chloride, is an inorganic compound of gold and chlorine with the molecular formula Au_{2}Cl_{6}. The "III" in the name indicates that the gold has an oxidation state of +3, typical for many gold compounds. It has two forms, the monohydrate (AuCl_{3}·H_{2}O) and the anhydrous form, which are both hygroscopic and light-sensitive solids. This compound is a dimer of AuCl_{3}. This compound has a few uses, such as an oxidizing agent and for catalyzing various organic reactions.

== Structure ==
AuCl_{3} exists as a chloride-bridged dimer both as a solid and vapour, at least at low temperatures. Gold(III) bromide behaves analogously. The structure is similar to that of iodine(III) chloride.

Each gold center is square planar in gold(III) chloride, which is typical of a metal complex with a d^{8} electron count. The bonding in AuCl_{3} is considered somewhat covalent.

== Properties ==
Gold(III) chloride is a diamagnetic light-sensitive red crystalline solid that forms the orange monohydrate, AuCl_{3} · H_{2}O; the anhydrous and monohydrate are both hygroscopic. The anhydrous form absorbs moisture from the air to form the monohydrate which can be reversed by the addition of thionyl chloride.

== Preparation ==
Gold(III) chloride was first prepared in 1666 by Robert Boyle by the reaction of metallic gold and chlorine gas at 180 °C:

2 Au + 3 Cl_{2} → Au_{2}Cl_{6}

This method is the most common method of preparing gold(III) chloride. It can also be prepared by reacting gold powder with iodine monochloride:

2 Au + 6 ICl → 2 AuCl_{3} + 3 I_{2}

The chlorination reaction can be conducted in the presence of tetrabutylammonium chloride, the product being the lipophilic salt tetrabutylammonium tetrachloraurate.

Another method of preparation is via chloroauric acid, which is obtained by first dissolving the gold powder in aqua regia to give chloroauric acid:

Au + HNO_{3} + 4 HCl → H[AuCl_{4}] + 2 H_{2}O + NO

The resulting chloroauric acid is subsequently heated in an inert atmosphere at around 100 °C to give Au_{2}Cl_{6}:

2 H[AuCl_{4}] → Au_{2}Cl_{6} + 2 HCl

== Reactions ==
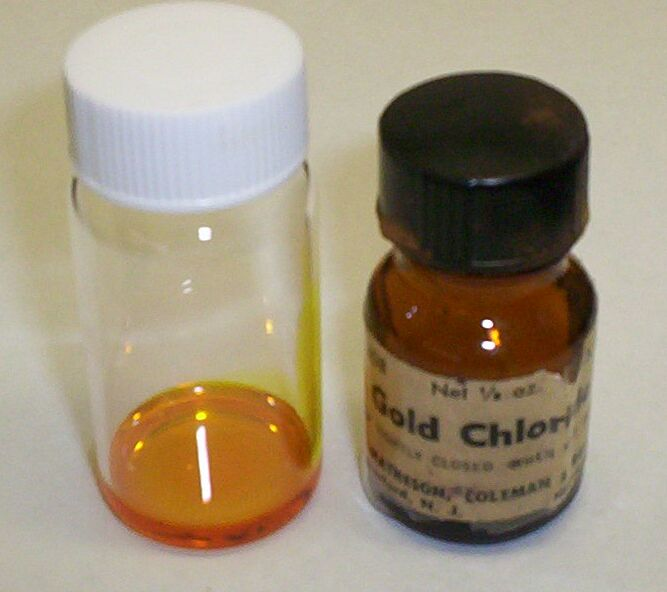
Concentrated aqueous solution of gold(III) chloride

=== Decomposition ===
Anhydrous AuCl_{3} begins to decompose to AuCl (gold(I) chloride) at around 160 °C (320 °F); however, this, in turn, undergoes disproportionation at higher temperatures to give gold metal and AuCl_{3}:

AuCl_{3} → AuCl + Cl_{2} (160 °C)
3 AuCl → AuCl_{3} + 2 Au (>210 °C)

Due to the disproportionation of AuCl, above 210 °C, most of the gold is in the form of elemental gold.

Gold(III) chloride is more stable in a chlorine atmosphere and can sublime at around 200 °C without any decomposition. In a chlorine atmosphere, AuCl_{3} decomposes at 254 °C yielding AuCl which in turn decomposes at 282 °C to elemental gold. This fact that no gold chlorides can exist above 400 °C is used in the Miller process.

=== Other reactions ===
AuCl_{3} is a Lewis acid and readily forms complexes. For example, it reacts with hydrochloric acid to form chloroauric acid (H[AuCl_{4}]):

HCl + AuCl_{3} → H^{+} + [AuCl_{4}]^{−}

Chloroauric acid is the product formed when gold dissolves in aqua regia.

On contact with water, AuCl_{3} forms acidic hydrates and the conjugate base [AuCl_{3}(OH)]^{−}. A Fe^{2+} ion may reduce it, causing elemental gold to be precipitated from the solution.

Other chloride sources, such as KCl, also convert AuCl_{3} into [AuCl_{4}]^{−}. Aqueous solutions of AuCl_{3} react with an aqueous base such as sodium hydroxide to form a precipitate of Au(OH)_{3}, which will dissolve in excess NaOH to form sodium aurate (NaAuO_{2}). If gently heated, Au(OH)_{3} decomposes to gold(III) oxide, Au_{2}O_{3}, and then to gold metal.

Gold(III) chloride is the starting point for the chemical synthesis of many other gold compounds. For example, the reaction with potassium cyanide produces the water-soluble complex, K[Au(CN)_{4}]:

AuCl_{3} + 4 KCN → K[Au(CN)_{4}] + 3 KCl

Gold(III) fluoride can be also produced from gold(III) chloride by reacting it with bromine trifluoride.

Gold(III) chloride reacts with benzene under mild conditions (reaction times of a few minutes at room temperature) to produce the dimeric phenylgold(III) dichloride; a variety of other arenes undergo a similar reaction:

2 PhH + Au_{2}Cl_{6} → [PhAuCl_{2}]_{2} + 2 HCl

Gold(III) chloride reacts with carbon monoxide in a variety of ways. For example, the reaction of anhydrous AuCl_{3} and carbon monoxide under SOCl_{2} produces gold(I,III) chloride with Au(CO)Cl as an intermediate:

2 AuCl_{3} + 2 CO → Au_{4}Cl_{8} + 2 COCl_{2}

If carbon monoxide is in excess, Au(CO)Cl is produced instead.

However, under tetrachloroethylene and at 120 °C, gold(III) chloride is first reduced to gold(I) chloride, which further reacts to form Au(CO)Cl. AuCl_{3} is also known to catalyze the production of phosgene.

== Applications ==
Gold(III) chloride has many uses in the laboratory, and primarily thrives in this environment.

=== Organic synthesis ===
Since 2003, AuCl_{3} has attracted the interest of organic chemists as a mild acid catalyst for various reactions, although no transformations have been commercialised. Gold(III) salts, especially Na[AuCl_{4}], provide an alternative to mercury(II) salts as catalysts for reactions involving alkynes. An illustrative reaction is the hydration of terminal alkynes to produce acetyl compounds.

Gold catalyses the alkylation of certain aromatic rings and the conversion of furans to phenols. Some alkynes undergo amination in the presence of gold(III) catalysts. For example, a mixture of acetonitrile and gold(III) chloride catalyses the alkylation of 2-methylfuran by methyl vinyl ketone at the 5-position:

The efficiency of this organogold reaction is noteworthy because both the furan and the ketone are sensitive to side reactions such as polymerisation under acidic conditions. In some cases where alkynes are present, phenols sometimes form (Ts is an abbreviation for tosyl):

This reaction involves a rearrangement that gives a new aromatic ring.

Another example of an AuCl_{3} catalyzed reaction is a hydroarylation, which is basically a Friedel-Crafts reaction using metal-alkyne complexes. Example, the reaction of mesitylene with phenylacetylene:

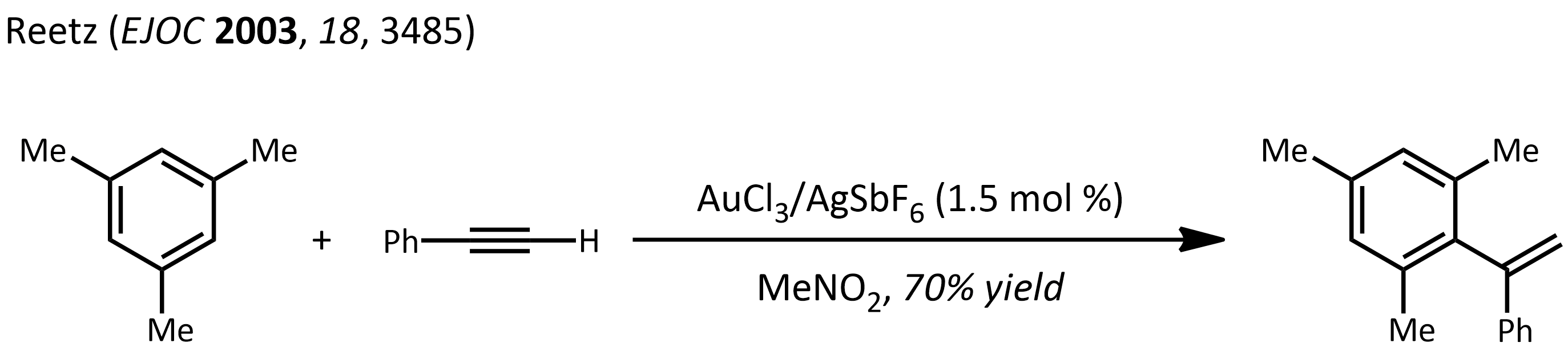

Gold(III) chloride can be used for the direct oxidation of primary amines into ketones, such as the oxidation of cyclohexylamine to cyclohexanone.

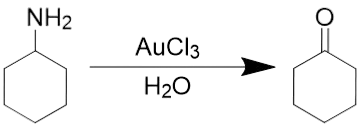

This reaction is pH sensitive, requiring a mildly acidic pH to proceed, however, it does not require any additional steps.

In the production of organogold(III) compounds, AuCl_{3} is used as a source of gold. A main example of this is the production of monoarylgold(III) complexes, which are produced by direct electrophilic auration of arenes by gold(III) chloride.

=== Gold nanoparticles ===
Gold(III) chloride is used in the synthesis of gold nanoparticles, which are extensively studied for their unique size-dependent properties and applications in fields such as electronics, optics, and biomedicine. Gold nanoparticles can be prepared by reducing gold(III) chloride with a reducing agent such as sodium tetrafluoroborate, followed by stabilization with a capping agent.

=== Photography ===
Gold(III) chloride has been used historically in the photography industry as a sensitizer in the production of photographic films and papers. However, with the advent of digital photography, its use in this field has diminished.

== Natural occurrence ==
This compound does not occur naturally; however, a similar compound with the formula AuO(OH,Cl)·nH_{2}O is known as a product of natural gold oxidation.
