= Gold(III) bromide =

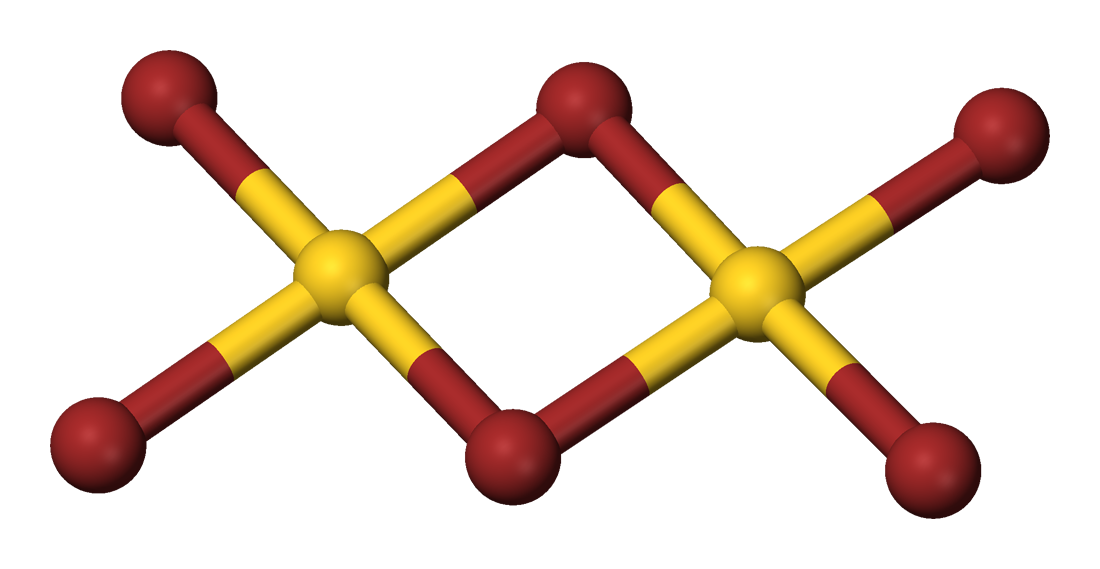
- Ball-and-stick model of gold(III) bromide

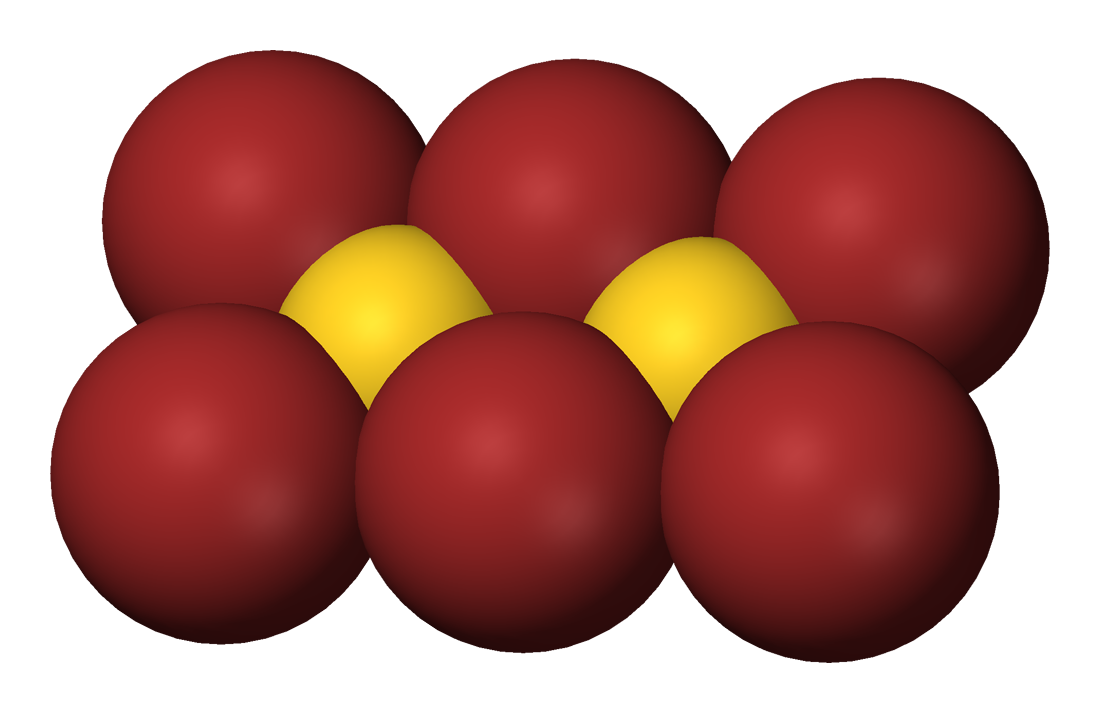
- Space-filling model of gold(III) bromide

Names
- Other names Auric bromide Gold bromide Gold(III) bromide Gold tribromide Digold hexabromide

Identifiers
CAS Number	10294-28-7
3D model (JSmol)	ionic form: Interactive image; covalent form: Interactive image
ChEBI	CHEBI:30079
ChemSpider	9548892
ECHA InfoCard	100.030.582
EC Number	233-654-2
Gmelin Reference	164245
PubChem CID	82525
UNII	4PJV3VH75Y
CompTox Dashboard (EPA)	DTXSID9065025
- InChI: InChI=1S/Au.3BrH/h;3*1H/q+3;;;/p-3 Key: OVWPJGBVJCTEBJ-UHFFFAOYSA-K; InChI=1S/Au.3BrH/h;3*1H/q+3;;;/p-3 Key: OVWPJGBVJCTEBJ-DFZHHIFOAK; Key: OVWPJGBVJCTEBJ-UHFFFAOYSA-K
- SMILES: ionic form: [Au+3].[Br-].[Br-].[Br-]; covalent form: Br[Au-]1(Br)[Br+][Au-]([Br+]1)(Br)Br

Properties
Chemical formula	AuBr_{3}
Molar mass	436.679 g·mol^{−1}
Appearance	dark red to black crystals
Melting point	97.5 °C (207.5 °F; 370.6 K)
Solubility in water	Slightly soluble

Hazards
- GHS labelling
Pictograms	(GHS05: Corrosive)
Signal word	Danger
Hazard statements	H314
Precautionary statements	P260, P264, P280, P301+P330+P331, P302+P361+P354, P304+P340, P305+P354+P338, P316, P321, P363, P405, P501
NFPA 704 (fire diamond)	3
- Except where otherwise noted, data are given for materials in their standard state (at 25 °C [77 °F], 100 kPa). verify (what is ?) Infobox references

Gold(III) bromide is a dark-red to black crystalline solid. It has the empirical formula AuBr_{3}, but exists as a dimer with the molecular formula Au_{2}Br_{6} in which two gold atoms are bridged by two bromine atoms. It is commonly referred to as gold(III) bromide, gold tribromide, and rarely but traditionally auric bromide, and sometimes as digold hexabromide. The analogous copper or silver tribromides do not exist.

== History ==
The first mention of any research or study of the gold halides dates back to the early-to-mid-19th century, and there are three primary researchers associated with the extensive investigation of this particular area of chemistry: Thomsen, Schottländer, and Krüss.

== Structure ==
Gold(III) bromide adopts structures seen for the other gold(III) trihalide dimeric compounds, such as the chloride. The gold centers exhibit square planar coordination with bond angles of roughly 90 degrees.

Calculations indicate that in the hypothetical monomeric forms of the gold trihalides, the Jahn-Teller effect causes differences to arise in the structures of the gold halide complexes. For instance, gold(III) bromide contains one long and two short gold-bromine bonds whereas gold(III) chloride and gold(III) fluoride consist of two long and one short gold-halogen bonds. Moreover, gold tribromide does not exhibit the same coordination around the central gold atom as gold trichloride or gold trifluoride. In the latter complexes, the coordination exhibits a T-conformation, but in gold tribromide the coordination exists as more of a dynamic balance between a Y-conformation and a T-conformation. This coordination difference can be attributed to the Jahn-Teller effect but more so to the decrease in π-bonding of the gold atoms with the bromine ligands compared to the π-bonding found with fluorine and chlorine ligands. It is also this decrease in π-bonding which explains why gold tribromide is less stable than its trifluoride and trichloride counterparts.

== Preparation ==
The most common synthesis method of gold(III) bromide is heating gold and excess liquid bromine at 140 °C:

2 Au + 3 Br_{2} → Au_{2}Br_{6}

Alternatively, the halide-exchange reaction of gold(III) chloride with hydrobromic acid has also been proven successful in synthesizing gold(III) bromide:

Au_{2}Cl_{6} + 6 HBr → 6 HCl + Au_{2}Br_{6}

== Chemical properties ==
Gold(III) displays square planar coordination geometry.

Gold(III) trihalides form a variety of four-coordinate adducts. One example is the hydrate AuBr_{3}·H_{2}O. Another well known adduct is that with tetrahydrothiophene. The tetrabromide is also known:

HBr + AuBr_{3} → H^{+}[AuBr_{4}]^{−}

== Uses ==
=== Catalytic chemistry ===
Gold(III) bromide catalyzes a variety of reactions. In one example, it catalyzes the Diels-Alder reaction of an enynal unit and carbonyl.

Another catalytic use of gold tribromide is in the nucleophilic substitution reaction of propargylic alcohols. In this reaction, the gold complex serves as an alcohol-activating agent to facilitate the substitution.

=== Ketamine detection ===
Gold(III) bromide can be used as a testing reagent for the presence of ketamine.

0.25% AuBr_{3} 0.1M NaOH is prepared to give a brownish-yellow solution. Two drops of this are added to a spotting plate and a small amount of ketamine is added. The mixture gives a deep purple color within approximately one minute, which turns to a dark, blackish-purple color within approximately two minutes.

Acetaminophen, ascorbic acid, heroin, lactose, mannitol, morphine, and sucrose all cause an instant colour change to purple, as do other compounds with phenol and hydroxyl groups.

Nothing commonly found in conjunction with ketamine gave the same colour change in the same time.

"The initial purple color may be due to the formation of a complex between the gold and the ketamine. The cause for the change of color from purple to dark blackish-purple is unknown; however, it may be due to a redox reaction that produces a small amount of colloidal gold."
