= Gold monoiodide =

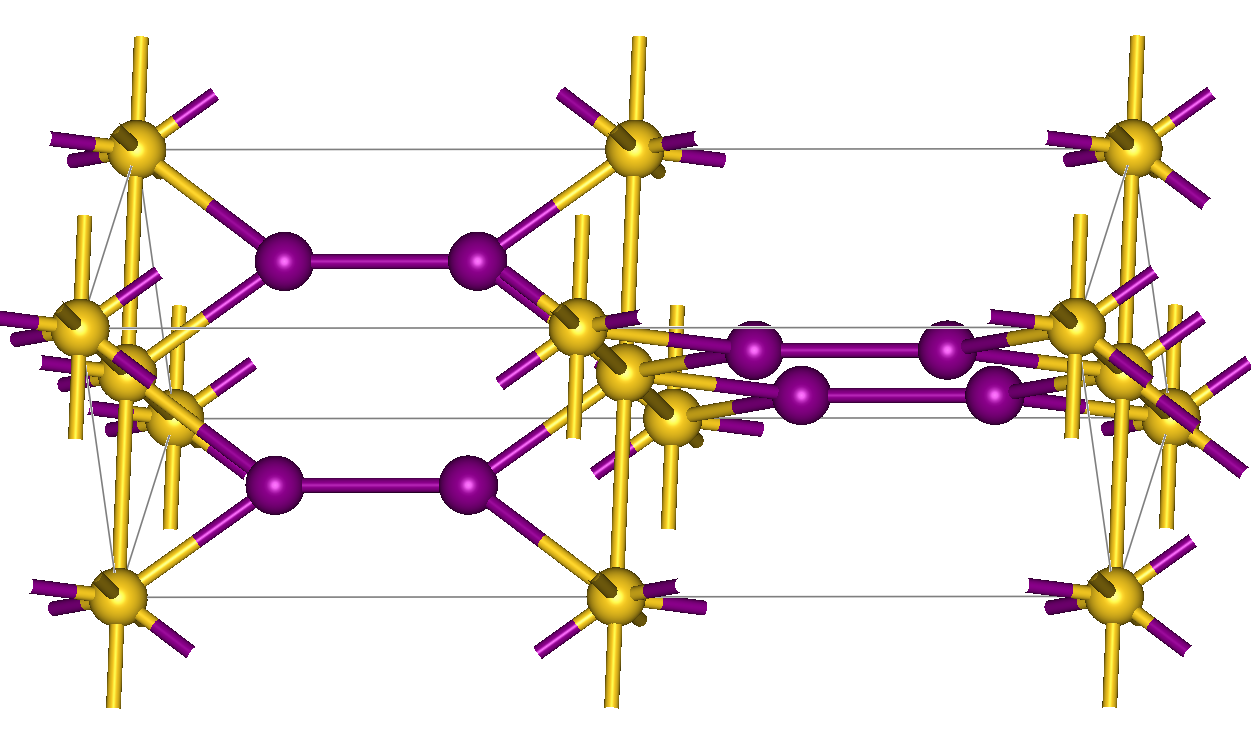

Names
- IUPAC name Iodogold
- Systematic IUPAC name Gold(I) iodide
- Other names Gold monoiodide Aurous iodide

Identifiers
CAS Number	10294-31-2
3D model (JSmol)	Interactive image
ChemSpider	74478
ECHA InfoCard	100.030.584
PubChem CID	82526
UNII	T1UDV7ES1A
CompTox Dashboard (EPA)	DTXSID9065027
- InChI: InChI=1S/Au.HI/h;1H/q+1;/p-1 Key: ATGIETUGWDAYPU-UHFFFAOYSA-M
- SMILES: [Au]I

Properties
Chemical formula	AuI
Molar mass	323.871 g/mol
Appearance	Yellowish to greenish-yellow powder
Density	8.25 g/cm^{3}
Magnetic susceptibility (χ)	−91.0·10^{−6} cm^{3}/mol

Structure
Crystal structure	tetragonal, Pearson symbol tP8, Z = 4
Space group	P4_{2}/ncm (No. 138)
Lattice constant	a = 0.435, b = 0.435, c = 1.373 nm

Hazards
- GHS labelling
Pictograms	(GHS07: Exclamation mark)
Signal word	Warning
Hazard statements	H315, H319, H335
Precautionary statements	P302+P352, P305+P351+P338
- Except where otherwise noted, data are given for materials in their standard state (at 25 °C [77 °F], 100 kPa). Infobox references

Gold monoiodide is the inorganic compound of gold and iodine with the formula AuI. It can be synthesized by dissolving gold powder in an aqueous solution of iodine and potassium iodide. With Lewis bases, AuI reacts to give numerous complexes.

== Preparation ==
Gold monoiodide can be obtained by reacting a tetrachloridoauric acid solution with potassium iodide. It is also possible to produce it by reacting gold and iodine in a protective atmosphere at around 390 °C.

== Properties ==
Gold monoiodide is a yellow, crystalline powder that gradually decomposes upon contact with water, humidity or light. It has a tetragonal crystal structure with the space group P4_{2}/ncm (space group no. 138), a = 4.359 Å, c = 13.711 Å.
