= Gold(I) cyanide =

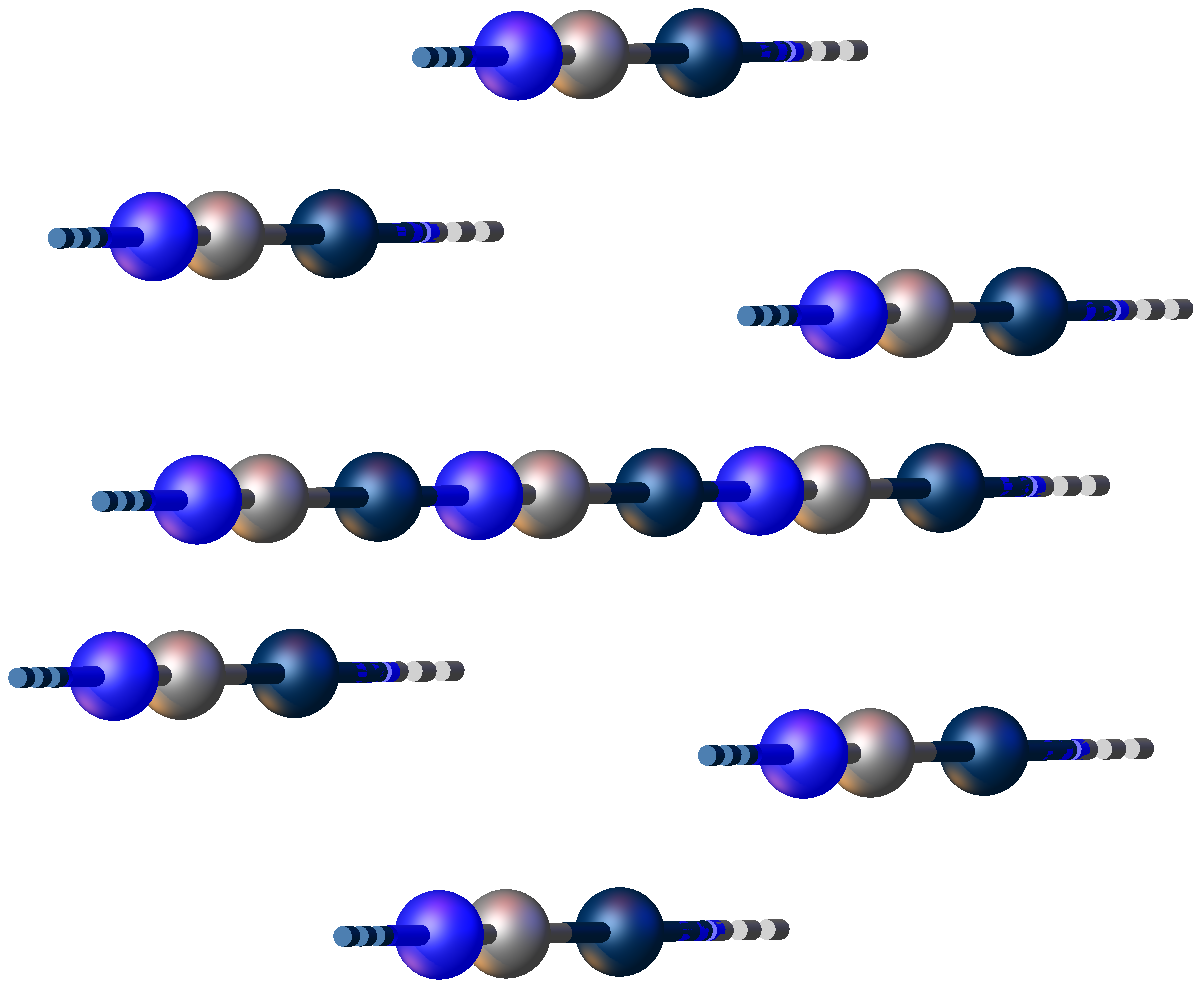

Names
- Other names Gold monocyanide

Identifiers
CAS Number	506-65-0
3D model (JSmol)	Interactive image
ChemSpider	61479
ECHA InfoCard	100.007.318
EC Number	208-049-1
PubChem CID	68172
UNII	03I25JDS1H
CompTox Dashboard (EPA)	DTXSID1060136
- InChI: InChI=1S/CN.Au/c1-2;/q-1;+1 Key: IZLAVFWQHMDDGK-UHFFFAOYSA-N
- SMILES: [Au+].[C-]#N

Properties
Chemical formula	CAuN
Molar mass	222.985 g·mol^{−1}
Appearance	dark yellow powder
Density	7.12 g·cm^{−3}
Solubility in water	insoluble

Structure
Crystal structure	hexagonal
Space group	P6mm (No. 183)
Lattice constant	a = 340 pm, c = 509 pm

Hazards
- GHS labelling
Pictograms	(GHS06: Toxic) (GHS09: Environmental hazard)
Signal word	Danger
Hazard statements	H300, H310, H330, H410

Related compounds
Other cations	Copper(I) cyanide Silver cyanide
Related compounds	Gold(III) cyanide
- Except where otherwise noted, data are given for materials in their standard state (at 25 °C [77 °F], 100 kPa). Infobox references

Gold(I) cyanide is the inorganic compound with the chemical formula AuCN. It is the binary cyanide of gold(I). It is an odourless, tasteless yellow solid. Wet gold(I) cyanide is unstable to light and will become greenish. Gold(I) cyanide itself is only of academic interest, but its derivative dicyanoaurate is an intermediate in gold cyanidation, the extraction of gold from its ores.

== Preparation ==
Solid gold(I) cyanide precipitates upon reaction of potassium dicyanoaurate with hydrochloric acid:

K[Au(CN)_{2}] + HCl → AuCN + HCN + KCl

It can also be produced by the reaction of gold(III) chloride and potassium cyanide.

== Reactions ==
The solid dissolves to form water-soluble adducts with a variety of ligands: cyanides, hydroxide, ammonia, thiosulfate and hydrosulfide.

Like most gold compounds, it converts to metallic gold upon heating.

== Structure ==
Gold(I) cyanide's is a coordination polymer consisting of linear chains of AuCN such that each Au(I) center is bonded to carbon and nitrogen. The structure is hexagonal with the lattice parameters a = 3.40 Å and c = 5.09 Å.
