= Carbon in pulp =

Gold extraction technique

Carbon in pulp (CIP) is an extraction technique for recovery of gold which has been liberated into a cyanide solution as part of the gold cyanidation process.

Introduced in the early 1980s, Carbon in Pulp is regarded as a simple and cheap process. As such it is used in most industrial applications where the presence of competing silver or copper does not prohibit its use. In the case of high (i.e., 1%) copper content, froth flotation is more typical.

Activated carbon acts like a sponge to dicyanoaurate, the main soluble gold species in gold extraction technologies. Hard carbon particles (much larger than the ore particle sizes) can be mixed with the solution. The gold cyanide complex adsorb onto the carbon and is proposed to be reduced back to the metal. Because the carbon particles are much larger than the ore particles, the coarse carbon can then be separated from the slurry by screening using a wire mesh.

== Loading gold into carbon ==

Leached pulp and carbon are transferred in a countercurrent flow arrangement involving a series of tanks, usually numbering 4 to 6. In the final tank, fresh or barren carbon is put in contact with low grade or tailings solution. At this tank the fresh carbon has a high affinity for gold and can remove trace amounts of gold (to levels below 0.01 mg/L Au in solution).

As it moves up the train, the carbon loads to higher and higher concentrations of gold, as it comes in contact with higher grade solutions. Typically concentrations as high as 4000 to 8000 grams of gold per tonne of carbon (g/t Au) can be achieved on the final loaded carbon, as it comes in contact with freshly leached ore and pregnant leach solution (PLS).

== Removal of gold from carbon ==
The final loaded carbon is removed from the machinery and extracted with a hot alkaline solution of cyanide. The elute solution passes through an electrowinning cell where the gold metal is deposited. The solution then passes back through the loaded carbon, extracting more gold and other metals. This process continues until the carbon has been stripped of its metals.

The cathodes (wire wool, now plated with gold and other metals) are removed and placed in sulfuric, hydrochloric, or nitric acid. The acid burns off the wire wool and other metals such as copper, and leaves a sediment of gold and a solution of acid and dissolved silver. The acid and silver are drained off, after which the gold sediment is washed with water numerous times.

== See also ==
Other gold cyanidation techniques:

- Merrill-Crowe process
- Electrowinning
