= Walter Ratcliff =

American architect

Walter Harris Ratcliff Jr.
- Born: 1881; London, England
- Died: 1978 (aged 96–97)
- Occupation: Architect

Walter Harris Ratcliff Jr. (1881—1978) was an English-born American architect, active in Berkeley, California. His work includes local landmarks and buildings listed on the National Register of Historic Places. He served as Berkeley's first city architect for part of his career and is credited with helping develop the first zoning regulations in the state.

== Biography ==
Ratcliff was born in London and came to the United States in 1894. Lilian Bridgman worked as a draftsperson in his office.

He partnered with John Galen Howard for a short time. He also worked with Alfred Henry Jacobs (as Ratcliff & Jacobs).

Ratcliff designed the John J. Cairns House at 2729 Elmwood Avenue, Walter Keane and his wife Barbara Keane lived in it. He also designed Armstrong College's Ratcliff building at 2222 Harold Way. Named after the architect, it is a Berkeley landmark. He designed the Charles W. Merrill House (1938) for mining engineer and San Francisco businessman Charles Washington Merrill. It is listed on the National Register. He is one of the noted architects with buildings in Panoramic Hill, Oakland/Berkeley, California. He was one of the architects who designed buildings for Mills College. He designed Hillside Elementary School (1928), a building listed on the National Register. Converted to a residence, it is on the List of largest houses in the United States.

Walter Ratcliff retired in 1955. His son, Robert W. Ratcliff, and later his grandson also became architects and maintained the firm he founded.

== List of buildings ==
=== National Register of Historic Places ===
The buildings he designed that are listed on the National Register include:

- Anna Head School for Girls, 2538 Channing Way, Berkeley, California
- Berkeley Day Nursery (1927), 2031 6th Street, Berkeley, California
- Chamber of Commerce Building, 2140–2144 Shattuck Avenue & 2071–2089 Center Street, Berkeley, California
- Hillside School (1928), 1581 Leroy Avenue, Berkeley, California
- Charles W. Merrill House (1938), 407 Camino Sobrante, Orinda, California

=== Other buildings ===
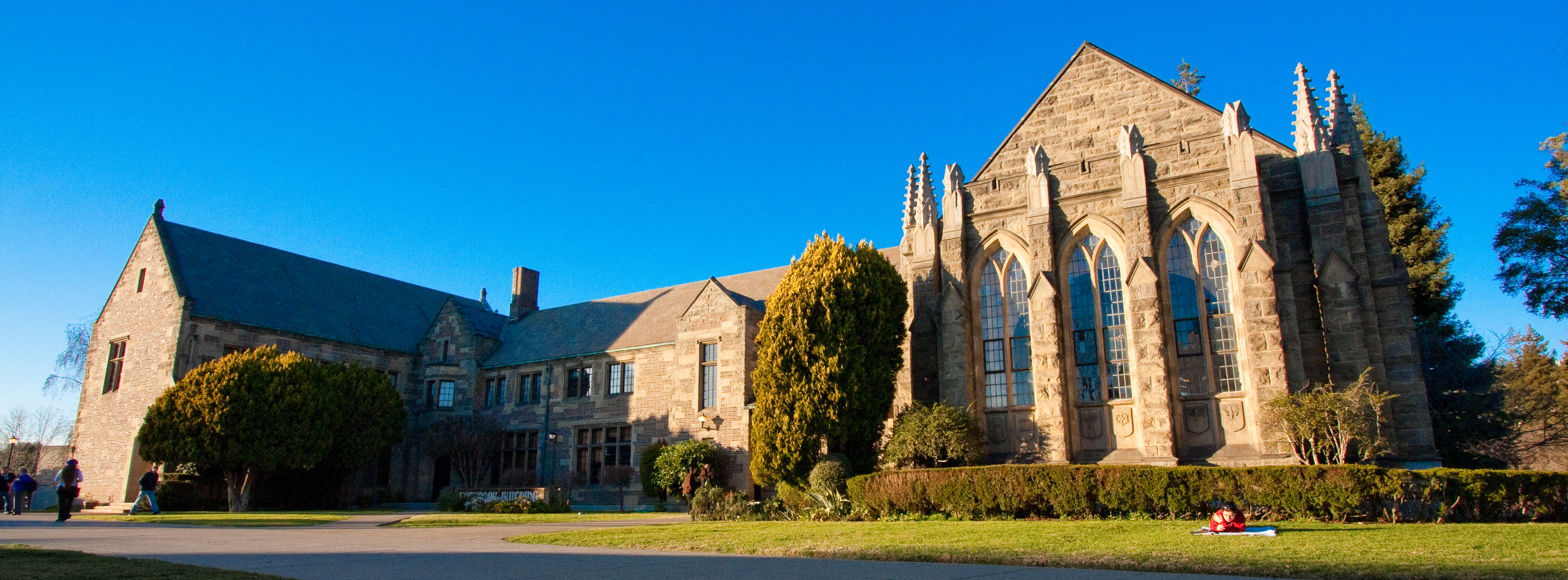
The Holbrook Building at Pacific School of Religion

- Several homes in the Piedmont, California–area
- Mason-McDuffie Building at 2102 Shattuck Avenue, Berkeley, California
- Wells Fargo Bank, 2959 College Ave, Berkeley, California at College Avenue and Ashby Avenue
- John Jolly Cairns House (1910), 2729 Elmwood Avenue, Berkeley, California
- Elks Club (1913; more recently Scandinavian Designs), 2018 Allston Way, Berkeley, California
- Channing Apartments (1913), 2409 College Avenue, Berkeley, California
- Malcolm X Elementary School (1920; formerly Lincoln School), 1731 Prince St, Berkeley, California
- Armstrong College (1923), 2210 Harold Way, Berkeley, California; later known as Dharma College
- Chamber of Commerce building (1925) (later Wells Fargo), 12-stories, Berkeley's first and only skyscraper until 1970
- Westminster House (1926), 2700 Bancroft Way, Berkeley, California
- Church Divinity School of the Pacific (1929), All Saints Chapel, Gibbs Hall, 2449 Ridge Road, Berkeley, California
- Brick gas station (c. 1930s), 1952 Oxford Street, Berkeley, California, a city-designated landmark, scheduled for demolition 2021
- Berkeley Baptist Divinity School, the chapel (1949) and academic buildings (1963), 2606 Dwight Way, Berkeley, California
- Pacific School of Religion buildings including Holbrook Hall at 1708 Scenic Avenue, Berkeley, California
- Northeastern University's Mills Campus, formerly Mills College buildings, including Ethel Moore Hall (c.1926) Oakland, California
