= Ammonium dicyanoaurate =

Names
- Other names Aurate(1-), bis(cyano-κC)-, ammonium (1:1), ammonium dicyanoaurate(I)

Identifiers
CAS Number	31096-40-9
3D model (JSmol)	Interactive image
ChemSpider	148036
ECHA InfoCard	100.045.862
EC Number	250-464-5
PubChem CID	169255
UNII	FNY6U483VA
CompTox Dashboard (EPA)	DTXSID30953196
- InChI: InChI=1S/2CN.Au.H3N/c2*1-2;;/h;;;1H3/q2*-1;+1;/p+1 Key: IQXHAJSMTNDJGA-UHFFFAOYSA-O
- SMILES: [C-]#N.[C-]#N.[NH4+].[Au+]

Properties
Chemical formula	C_{2}H_{4}AuN_{3}
Molar mass	267.042 g·mol^{−1}
Appearance	colorless crystals
Density	g/cm^{3}
Solubility in water	soluble
- Except where otherwise noted, data are given for materials in their standard state (at 25 °C [77 °F], 100 kPa). Infobox references

Ammonium dicyanoaurate is a chemical compound with the chemical formula C_{2}H_{4}AuN_{3}. This is a salt of ammonium as cation with an anion composed of a gold atom bearing two cyanide ligands.

== Synthesis ==
Ammonium dicyanoaurate can be synthesised by dissolution of gold(I) cyanide in ammonium cyanide solution:

AuCN + NH_{4}CN → NH_{4}[Au(CN)_{2}]

== Physical properties ==
The compound forms colorless crystals which are soluble in water and ethanol.
