= Hillside Elementary School =

- Hillside School
- U.S. National Register of Historic Places
- Berkeley Landmark
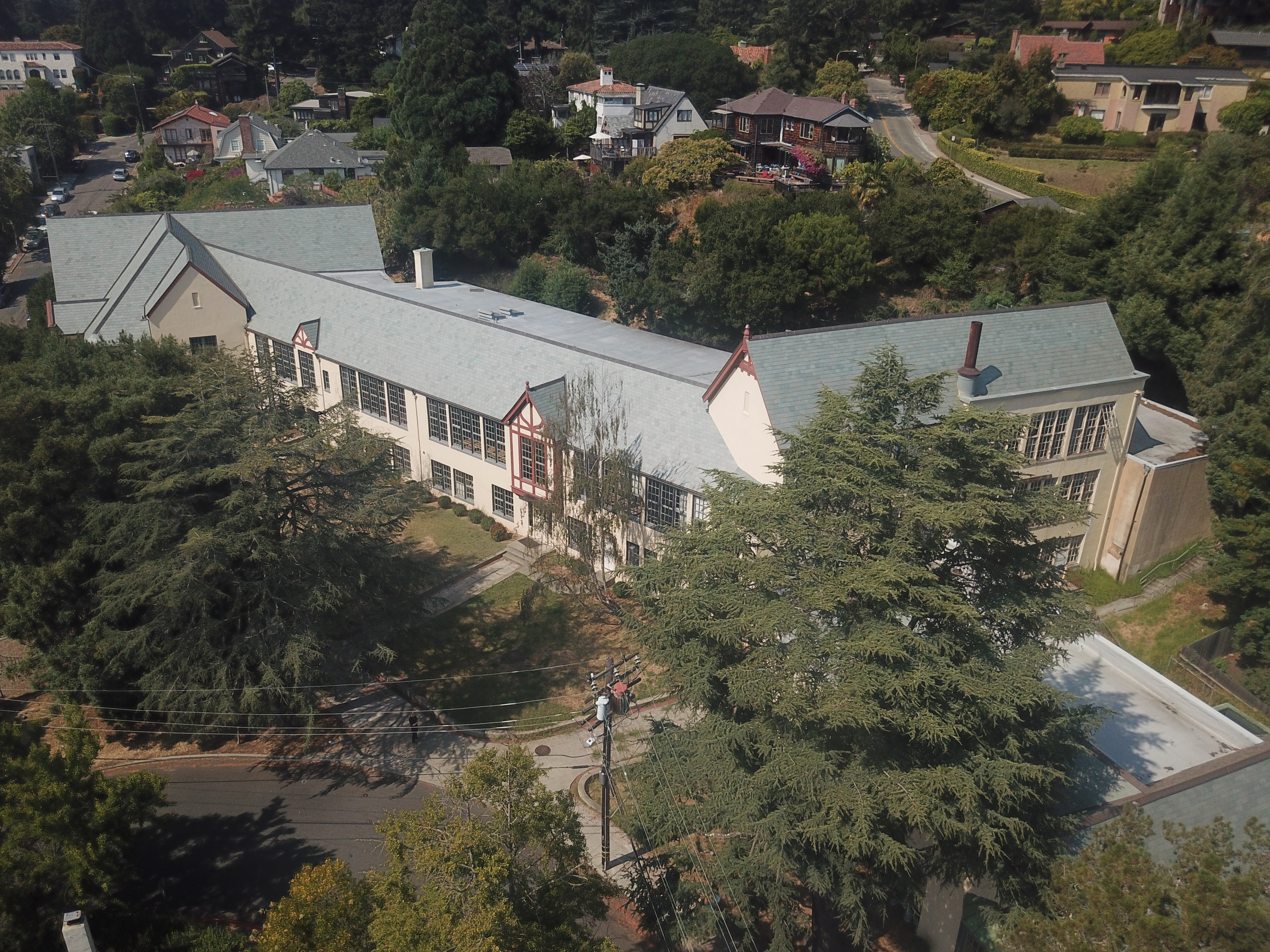
- Hillside School, Berkeley

- Location within Oakland, California Location within California Location within the United States
- Location: 1581 Le Roy Ave., Berkeley, California
- Coordinates: 37°52′51″N 122°15′32″W
- Area: 2.64 acres (1.07 ha)
- Built: 1925
- Architect: Walter H. Ratcliff
- Architectural style: Tudor Revival
- NRHP reference No.: 82000961
- BERKL No.: 61

Significant dates
- Added to NRHP: October 29, 1982
- Designated BERKL: June 21, 1982

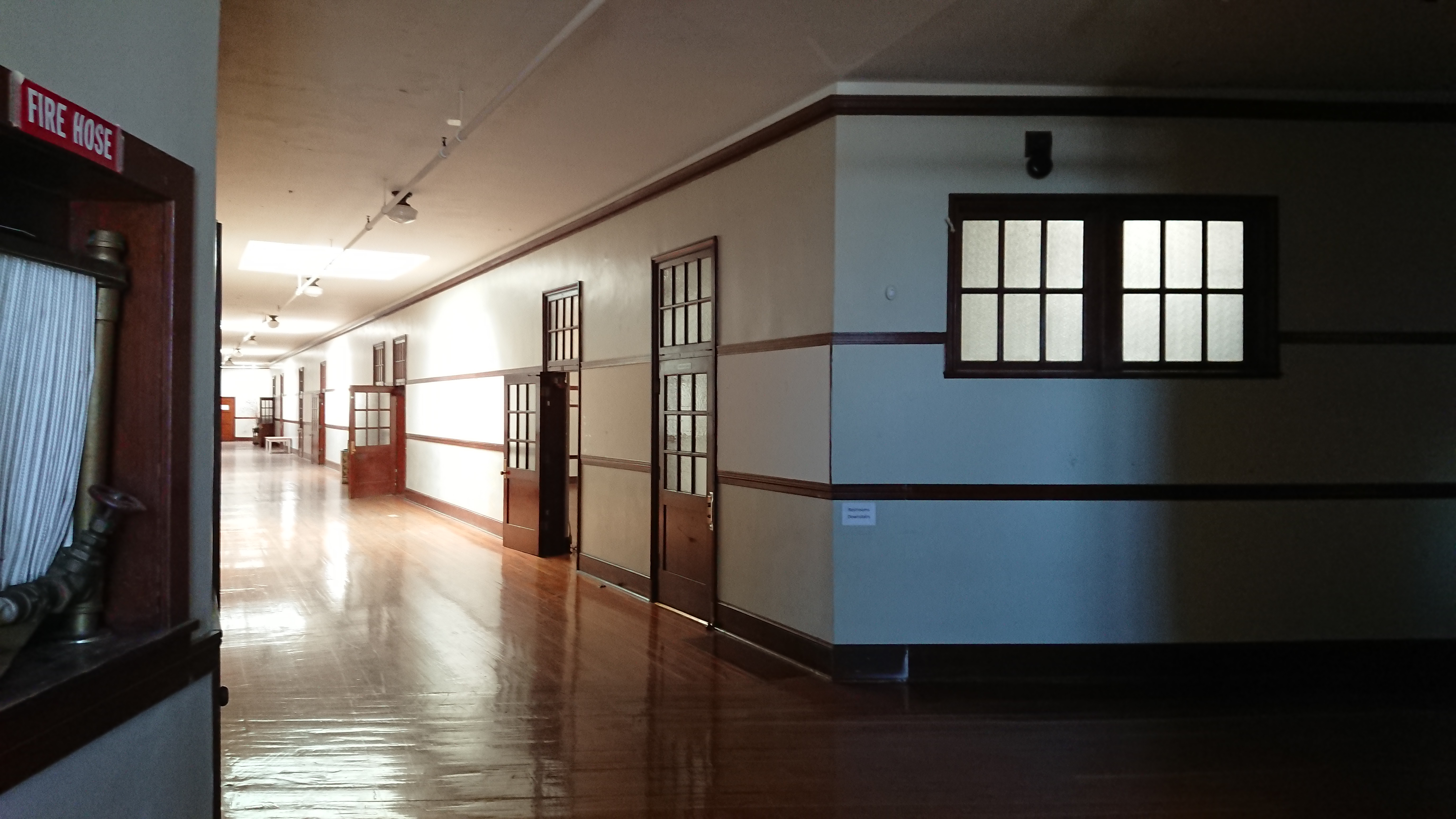
Hillside School hallway 2nd floor

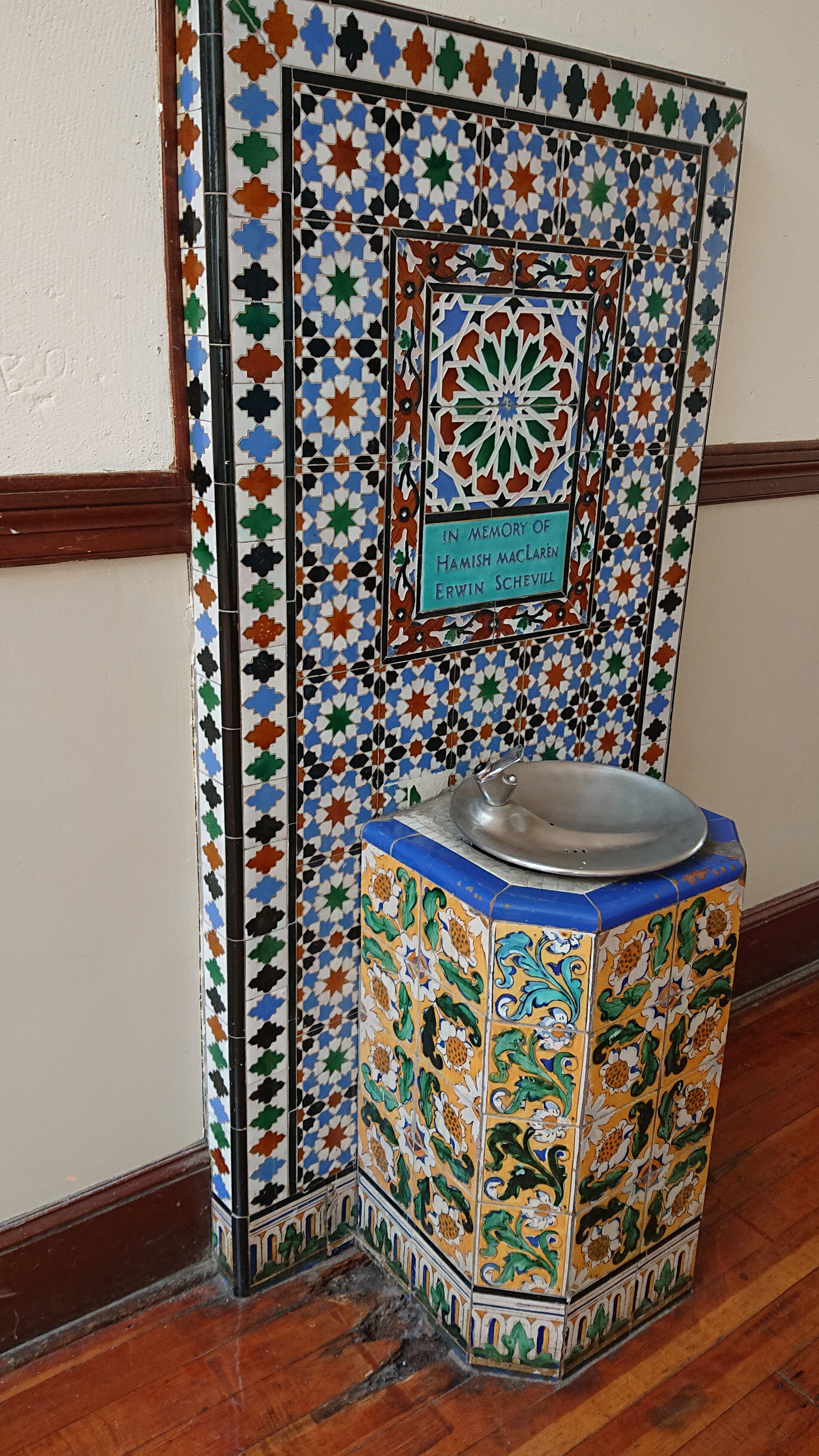
Water fountain

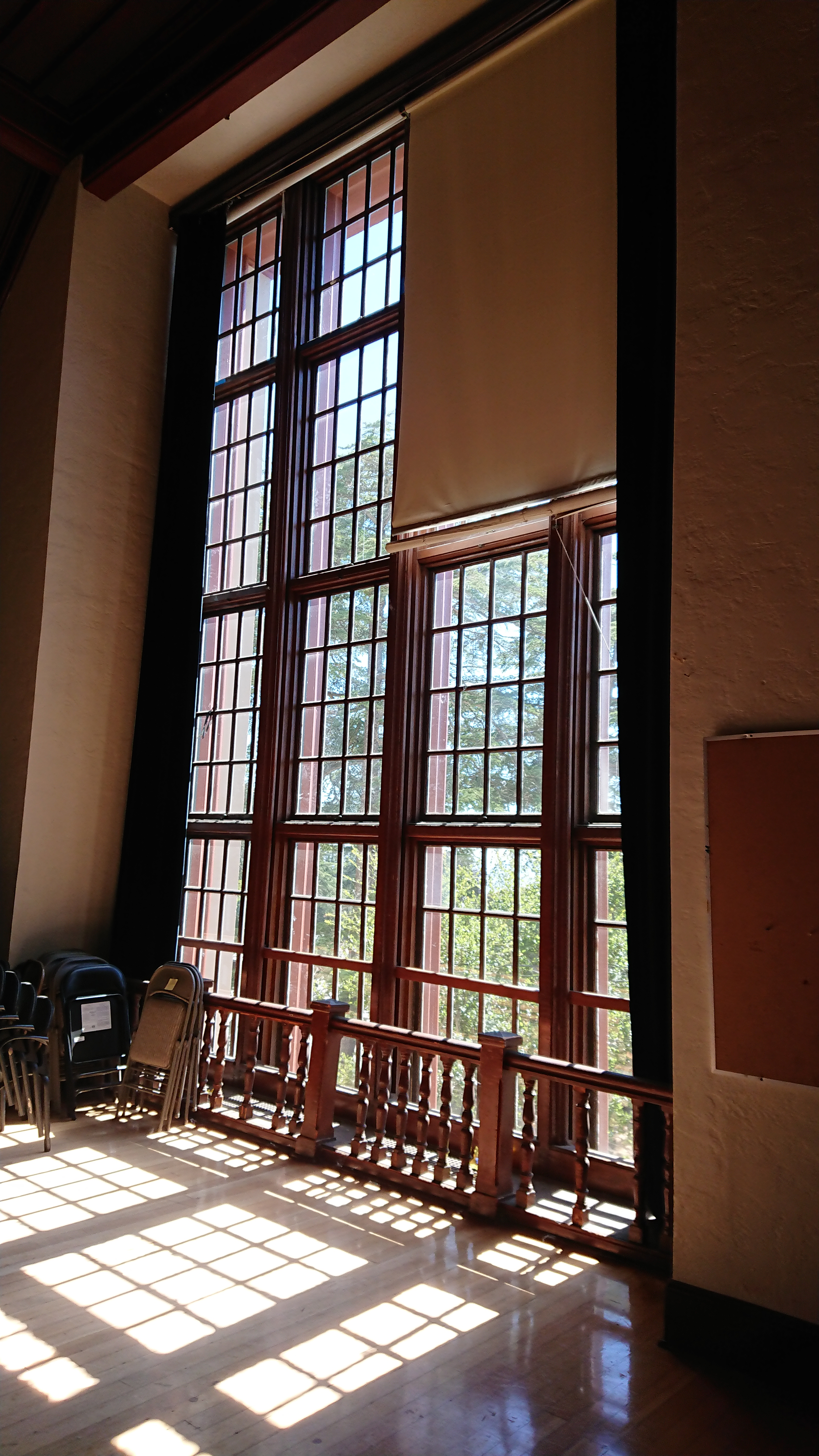
Auditorium windows

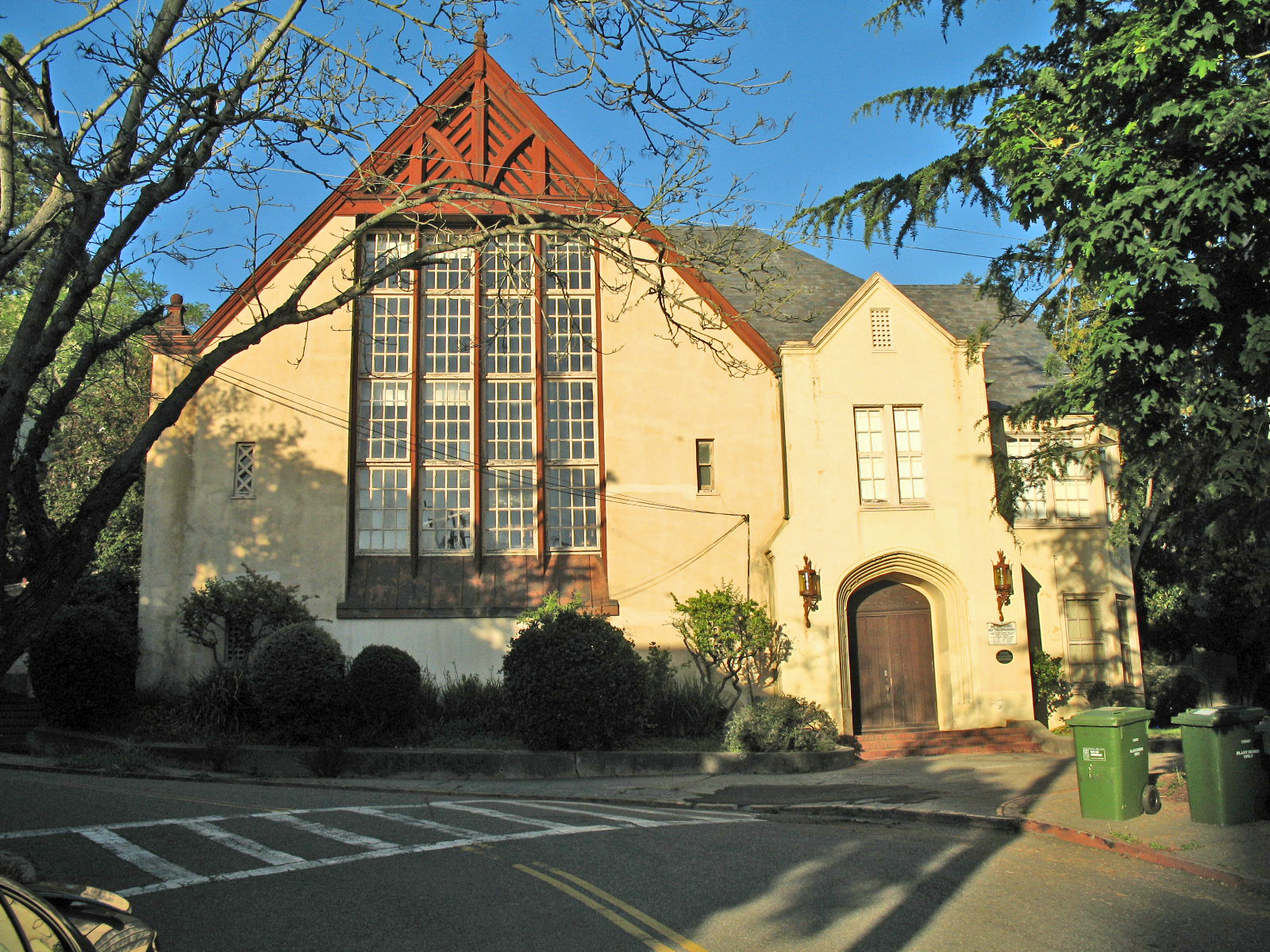
Buena Vista Way entrance

Detail from original blueprints

Hillside Elementary School is a 50,302 ft^{2} former public elementary school in the hills of Berkeley, California, at 1581 Le Roy Avenue, bordered by Le Roy Avenue, Buena Vista Way, and La Loma Avenue. It is registered as a local historic landmark listed on the National Register of Historic Places.

== History ==
Hillside first opened in the Fall of 1901 on the nearby southwest corner of Le Roy Avenue and Virginia Street. This first Hillside, constructed under the auspices of the newly formed Hillside Club, for the Berkeley Public Schools, was one of the hundreds of structures that were destroyed by the 1923 Berkeley fire. The school was temporarily relocated, from late 1923 until August 1926, to the University School (1414 Walnut Street) while a new school building was constructed.

The Berkeley School District built the present structure in 1925 on the site of several homes that were destroyed by the same fire that destroyed the original Hillside. It was designed by prominent Berkeley architect Walter H. Ratcliff.

A major seismic retrofit was made in the 1930s and an additional wing added in 1964-65. The 1930s work included upgrades pursuant to the Field Act which resulted from the 1933 Long Beach earthquake. The building is landmarked for the degree to which it is intact, along with the quality of both architectural design and construction.

In the late 1960s, Hillside became a primary school (K-3) as part of a district-wide re-organization. In 1982 it was added to the National Register of Historic Places (#82000961).

In 1983, the school district closed Hillside because of a declining school age population, and because it sits near or on the Hayward Fault. The Berkeley Montessori School (since renamed The Berkeley School) and the Berkeley Chess School leased part of the site.

In 2012, the Berkeley Unified School District sold the school to the German International School of Silicon Valley (GISSV). GISSV replaced damaged walkways and entrance steps and removed a deteriorated temporary building that had been situated on the old Kindergarten playground since the early 1970s, and in early 2016, replaced the original slate shingles with new historically accurate slate shingles and also replaced the original copper gutters, which had been vandalized and stolen. The school used it for their Berkeley campus from August 2012 until December 2016, when they closed the building due to unmet seismic retrofit needs. Diggings nearby show the fault may be braided in the area, and an active fault trace below the building cannot be ruled out.

In 2018, the German School sold the property to Finnish entrepreneur Samuli Seppälä, who plans to redevelop the property into a home and artists' colony.

Area residents have used Hillside's playground as a de facto neighborhood park since it was constructed; a pedestrian path is heavily used. In 2009, with the sale of the site to a housing developer pending, residents proposed a special assessment district to fund the purchase of the playground section of the site. Neighbors then requested a public easement on the playground, but were denied by the city; however, Seppälä said that the playground would be kept open voluntarily.

=== BUSD Principals ===
- Clara. G. Potwin, 1901-1907 (d.1907)
- Jeannette Barrows, 1907-1937 (d.1945)
- Eugenie E. Jackson, 1937-1943
- Helen B. Maslin, 1943-1959 (d.1963)
- Theodore F. Blitz, 1959-1973 (d.1993)
- Frank L. Fisher, 1973-1978
- Kathryne L. Favors, 1978-1981 (d.2008)
- Marian K. Altman, 1981-1983

== In film ==
Hillside stood in as an English mansion in the 2012 movie The Master. Filming took place during June 2011.

== See also ==
- La Loma Park
