= Edible Schoolyard =

School in California, United States of America

Coordinates: 37°52′57″N 122°16′34″W

The Edible Schoolyard (ESY) is a 1-acre (4,000 m^{2}) garden and kitchen program at the Martin Luther King Jr. Middle School, a public middle school in Berkeley, California. It was established in 1995 by chef and author Alice Waters. It is supported by the Edible Schoolyard Project, a non-profit organization founded by Waters that same year.

At the Edible Schoolyard, students participate in planting, harvesting, and preparing fresh food as part of their curriculum. According to the program, these activities are intended to reinforce classroom instruction in subjects such as mathematics, science, culture, and history, while helping students make connections among food, health, and the environment.

== History ==
The Edible Schoolyard was founded in 1995 in a vacant lot at the Martin Luther King Jr. Middle School. Waters combined her perspectives as a trained Montessori teacher, political activist, chef, and advocate of sustainable agriculture. Waters met with then principal Neil Smith to discuss the possibility of transforming the space into a garden project that would involve students, teachers, and the community.

Planning began in 1995, with cooking classes first offered during the 1995–96 school year. Initially students used organic produce from a local farm until the Edible Schoolyard Garden was producing harvests in 1997.

In 2004, the Edible Schoolyard Project co-developed the School Lunch Initiative in partnership with Berkeley Unified School District, the Center for Ecoliteracy, and Children's Hospital Oakland Research Center. The aim was to develop a model for school lunch programs to provide healthy, freshly prepared meals within their budget and also to connect to kitchen garden learning programs on campus. The initiative emphasized the connection between food education and improved school-food and student knowledge relating to food choices. Chef Ann Cooper was hired to direct the food service program for the Berkeley Unified School District and lead the transition to scratch-based cooking. As a result, processed foods were largely eliminated from the school lunch menu, and local produce became central to all school meals.

As of 2019, the Edible Schoolyard has a network of more than 5,800 kitchen/garden programs across the country. It provides an annual summer academy for food educators and nutrition services personnel, and continues to create a curriculum around kitchen/garden learning for grades 6 and up. As of May 2023, the network has grown to over 6,200 locations worldwide.

== Criticism ==
Caitlin Flanagan (2010) criticized the concept of edible schoolyards as detrimental to the educational needs of children. Flanagan's criticism generated a wider discussion of the Edible Schoolyard and other school garden programs. Proponents, such as journalist Emily Green, argue that school garden programs develop career skills and enrich the school curriculum.

W. Steven Barnett, a professor of education, notes that while "little research exists on the efficacy of a garden-based curriculum", Flanagan presents a false choice, noting that the gardens are "integrated into the child's learning experience". The head of Samuel J. Green School in New Orleans stated that student diet and academic performance improved after establishing an Edible Schoolyard program on their campus.
