= Loch Lomond Radium Works =

Coordinates: 56°00′08″N 4°34′50″W

Loch Lomond Radium Works was a company founded by John Stewart MacArthur in 1911 as the Radium Works in Halton, Cheshire, England. The company moved to Balloch, West Dunbartonshire, Scotland in 1915. The company produced radium for use in medicine and for radioluminescent paint until it was closed down in 1927.
