= Panoramic Hill, Oakland/Berkeley, California =

Panoramic Hill
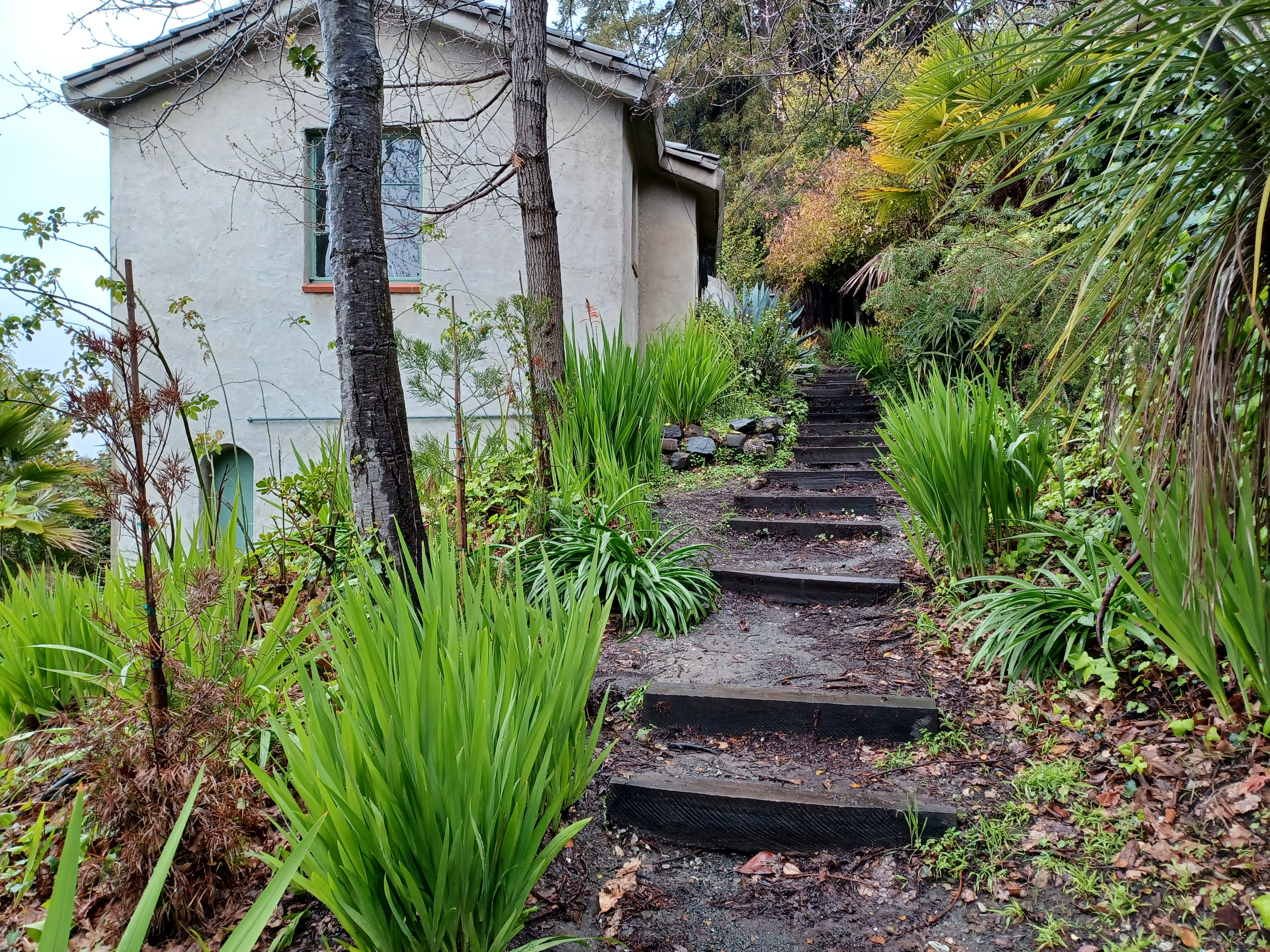
- A house in Panoramic Hill

- Location within Oakland and Berkeley
- Coordinates: 37.86948°N 122.248845°W
- Country: United States
- State: California
- County: Alameda
- Cities: Oakland and Berkeley
- Panoramic Hill
- U.S. National Register of Historic Places
- U.S. Historic district
- NRHP reference No.: 05000424
- Added to NRHP: October 21, 2005

Panoramic Hill is a residential neighborhood of the cities of Berkeley and Oakland, California defined by the homes along and within the access corridor defined by Panoramic Way.

== Geography ==
The Panoramic Hill Neighborhood is located at the eastern edge of the city of Berkeley, southeast of the University of California campus, and situated at the northwestern foot of the Claremont Canyon Regional Preserve and the Claremont Hills. The neighborhood is bounded by Piedmont Avenue, the Clark Kerr Campus and the main University of California campus. The eastern half of this neighborhood is in the City of Oakland. It includes the streets of Panoramic Way, Mosswood Road, Panoramic Place (Berkeley), Panoramic Place (Oakland), Arden Road, Dwight Place, and Dwight Way. The neighborhood is approximately 0.258 square miles.

=== Traffic ===
Panoramic Way is a very steep and narrow public road with numerous sharp turns and curves serving approximately 500 residents. Traffic can become difficult during rush hours, waste collection times or when construction and service vehicles are present. Emergency vehicles do regular patrols of the area to test their ability to access all residents in case of emergency. Where the street is only wide enough for one car, the car facing downhill must yield to the car facing uphill, as required by California Motor Vehicle Code.

=== Parking ===
Because of the Panoramic Hill Neighborhood's situation between both the city of Berkeley and the city of Oakland it is regulated by both cities with parking regulation. The Berkeley portion of the hill has a 2-hour limit and is patrolled between 8 AM and 7 PM, Monday through Saturday, excluding holidays. Residents can acquire a "K" parking permit. Parking in the Oakland portion of the hill is also limited to 2 hours and is patrolled between 8 AM and 6 PM, Monday through Friday. Residents can acquire an "L" parking permit.

=== Panoramic Walking Path ===
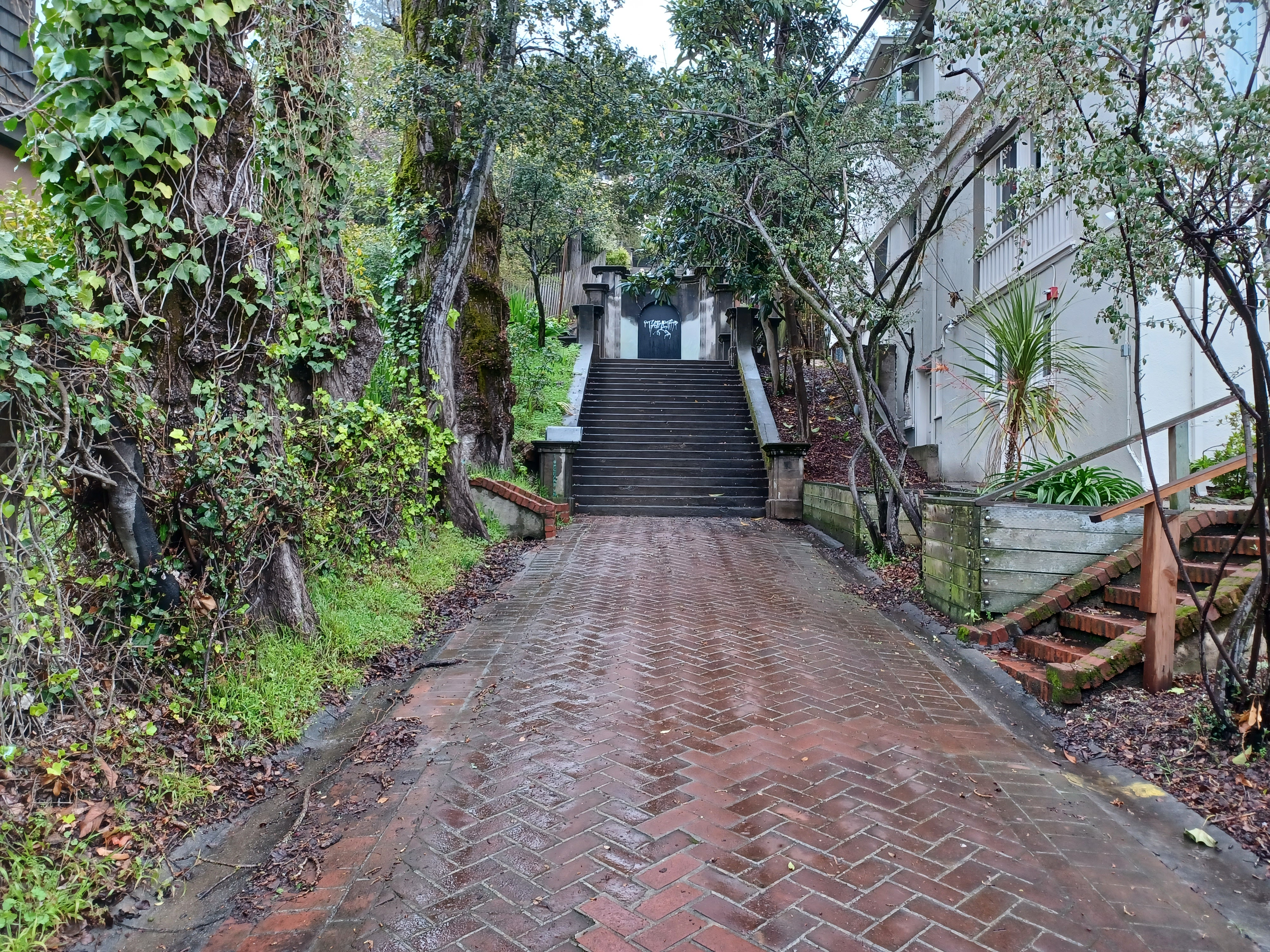
Orchard Lane

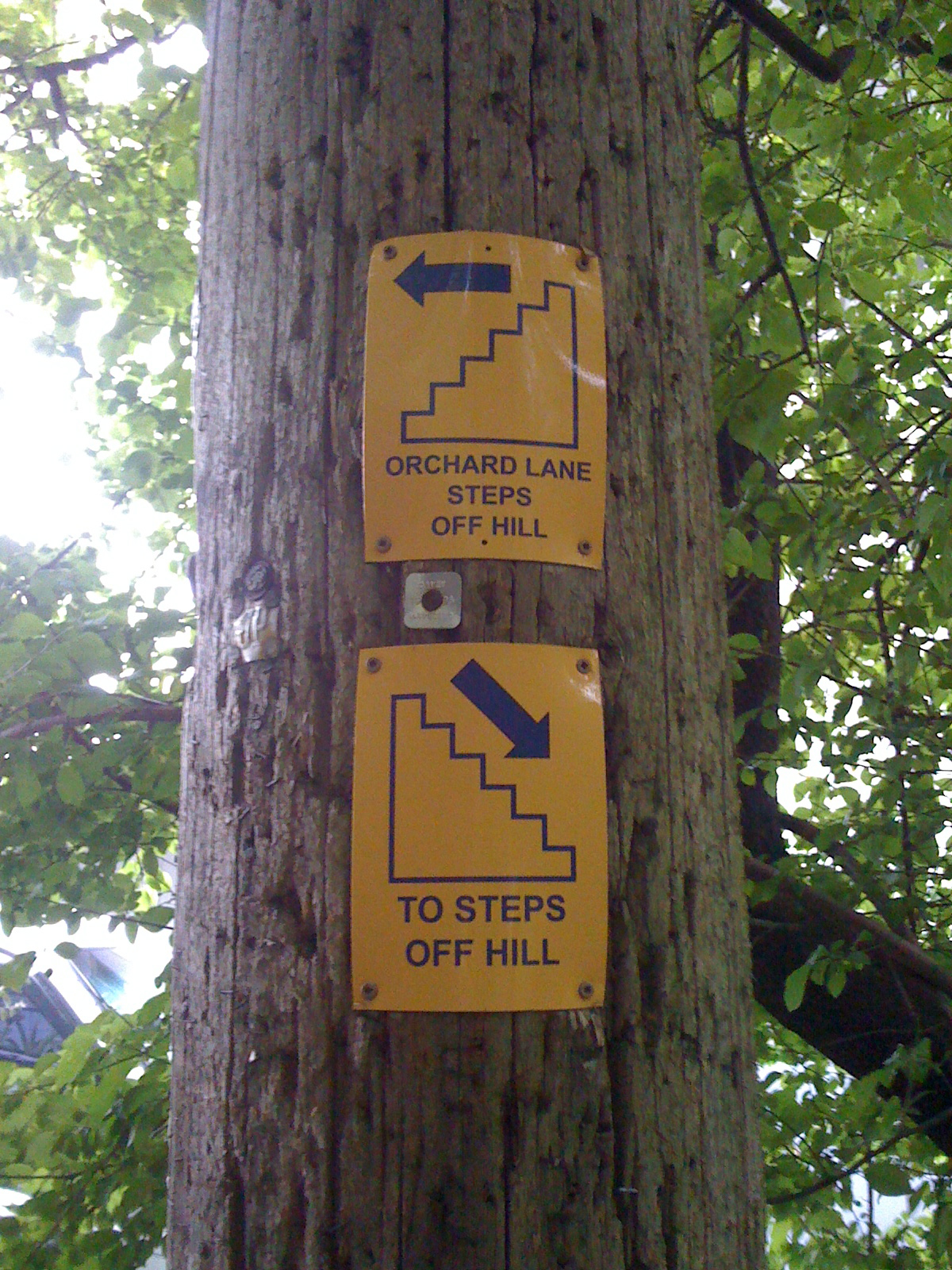
Signs Frequent The Hill To Indicate How to Get Down and "Off The Hill."

Panoramic Hill is home to a series of maintained walking paths and staircases that lead, on and off the road, halfway up the hill where they intersect a series of fire trails that lead into the hills. Each set of steps is treated as its own walking byway and is therefore named and well marked. Signs are also placed around the hill indicating the direction of the closest set of 'steps off the hill' for visitors who become lost among the trees, architecture, and windy roads. The lower steps are called Orchard Lane, and split at Panoramic Way (the vehicle road) and Mosswood Path a pedestrian pathway covered by antique red woods. Arden Steps are the penultimate set of steps in the series and are severely steep. Arden Steps and Arden Path meet at the cul-de-sac of Arden Road where Arden Path finishes the series with a sloping path and a final series up two dozen wooden steps.

A plaque at the entrance to the Orchard Lane and thus the bottom of the hill is inscribed:

"One of Berkeley's romantic treasures, Orchard Lane is the formal pedestrian entrance to the Panoramic Hill residential neighborhood. The walk and Classical staircase, complete with pillars, balustrades, concrete benches, and an overhanging bower of trees, was built by Warren Cheney, who developed Panoramic Hill. In 1904 Cheney, the former editor of the literary magazine The Californian, purchased the land. In 1909 he commissioned Henry Atkins to design the stairway that still links residences with the University and town and other walkways that climb the hill."

— Berkeley Historical Plaque Project 1998

== History ==
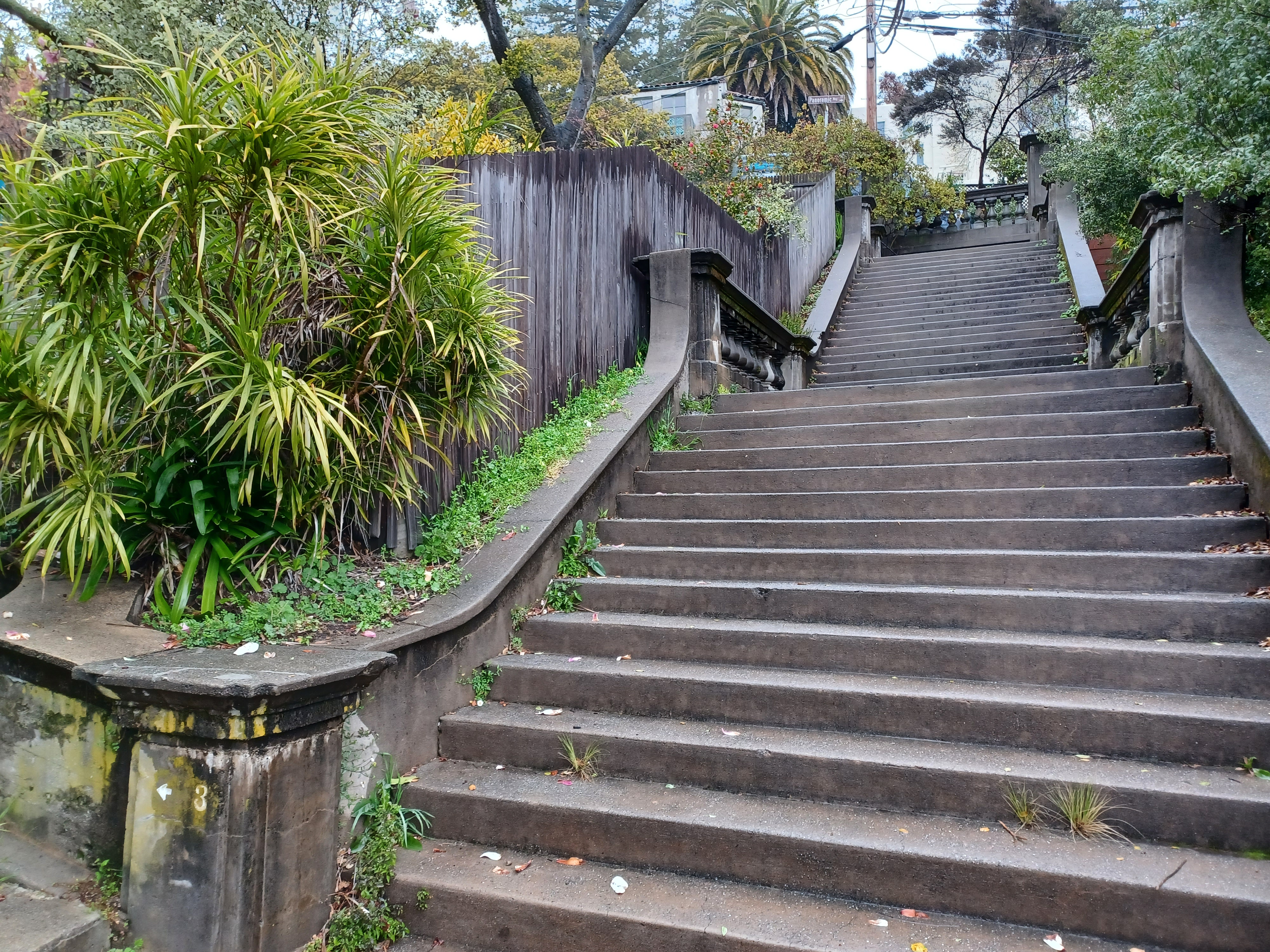
A staircase in Panoramic Hill

Established in 1904 by Warren Cheney, the Panoramic Hill neighborhood of Berkeley and Oakland enjoys a robust history.

Panoramic Hill was added to the National Register of Historic Places as a historic district in 2005.

== Fire Trail ==
The upper and lower Jordan trails are fire trails through the University of California ecological area. The university is required to keep the trails open for emergency vehicle access.

== Points of interest ==
The Berkeley Historical Society frequently conducts walking tours of Panoramic Hill and its surrounding trails and views.

=== Architecture ===
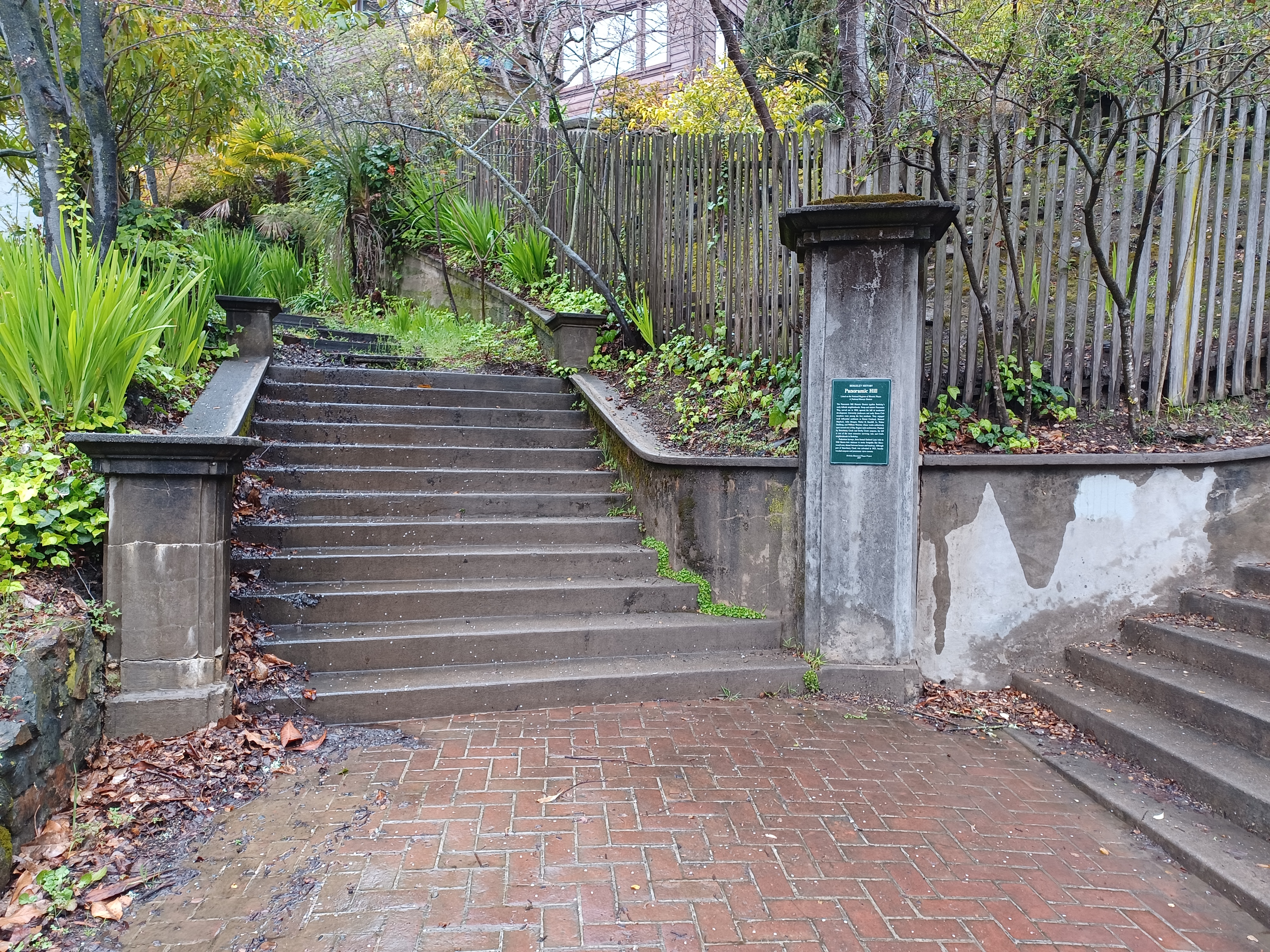
Panoramic Hill

"The quality of this area depends not so much on its individual buildings, though there are many fine structures by Berkeley's most important designers, but upon the survival of a complete neighborhood that provides a background for these buildings. Thus, the individual designs of Coxhead, Morgan, or Maybeck do not appear as museum pieces in a glass case, divorced of context, but convey the image and atmosphere of the intellectual and cultural milieu which aspired at the turn of the century to be the Athens of the West."

— John Beach

Panoramic Hill features the architecture of Julia Morgan, Ernest Coxhead, John Hudson Thomas, Walter Ratcliff, William Wurster, Walter Steilberg, Frank Lloyd Wright, Mark Mack, Harwell Hamilton Harris and Bernard Maybeck as well as a wide variety of craftsman built homes each uniquely adapting to the geography and encapsulating the view. The Panoramic Hill neighborhood is frequently a part of architectural walking tours in Berkeley. Panoramic Hill was named "Berkeley's Most Romantic Neighborhood" by the Berkeley Architectural Heritage Association.

== See also ==
- California Memorial Stadium
