= Charles W. Merrill House =

Historic house in California, United States

- U.S. National Register of Historic Places

- Location within California Location within the United States
- Location: 407 Camino Sobrante; Orinda, California
- Coordinates: 37°53′51″N 122°11′17″W
- Area: 0.8 acres (0.32 ha)
- Built: 1938
- Architect: Walter H. Ratcliff
- Landscape architect: Mable Symmes
- Architectural style: Spanish Colonial Revival
- NRHP reference No.: 05000251
- Added to NRHP: April 7, 2005

National Register 05000251 Charles W. Merrill House

The Charles W. Merrill House is a 6,000-square-foot residence built in 1938 and located in Orinda, California. Designed by regionally prominent architect Walter H. Ratcliff, of Berkeley, California for mining engineer and San Francisco businessman Charles Washington Merrill.

== History ==
Built in 1938, the house's architecture reflects elements of Spanish Colonial Revival architecture. However, with the house's two stories, low-pitched roofline, and second-story balcony on the front elevation, it also reflects Monterey style architecture, popular in large California homes built between 1925 and 1940.

The house and grounds were designed as a small country estate. The house occupies a hillside location and is sited on two stonework terraces, pierced by three stone staircases placed among gardens designed by landscape architect Mabel Symmes in 1938–1939.

The house is significant under Criterion B for its association with the final stage of Charles W. Merrill's career. Merrill lived in the house during the period in which he presided over a highly diversified engineering corporation, with worldwide influence, that had grown from Merrill's pioneering patents and discoveries of the 1890s and 1900s. The house also is significant under Criterion C as an example of the eclecticism that architect Walter H. Ratcliff brought to his architecture. Built in the mature phase of Ratcliff's career, the Merrill House with its elements of Spanish Colonial Revival and Monterey styles reflect Ratcliff's distinctive blend of academic eclecticism and keen awareness of regional topography, climate, and setting.

== See also ==
- National Register of Historic Places listings in Contra Costa County, California
