= Potassium dicyanoargentate =

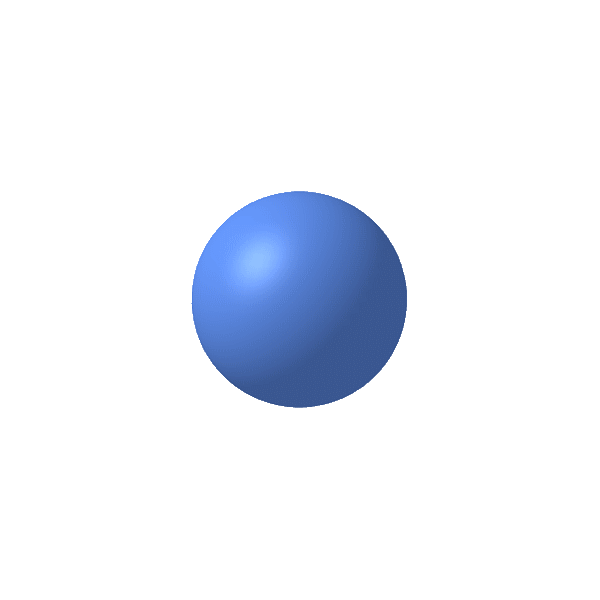

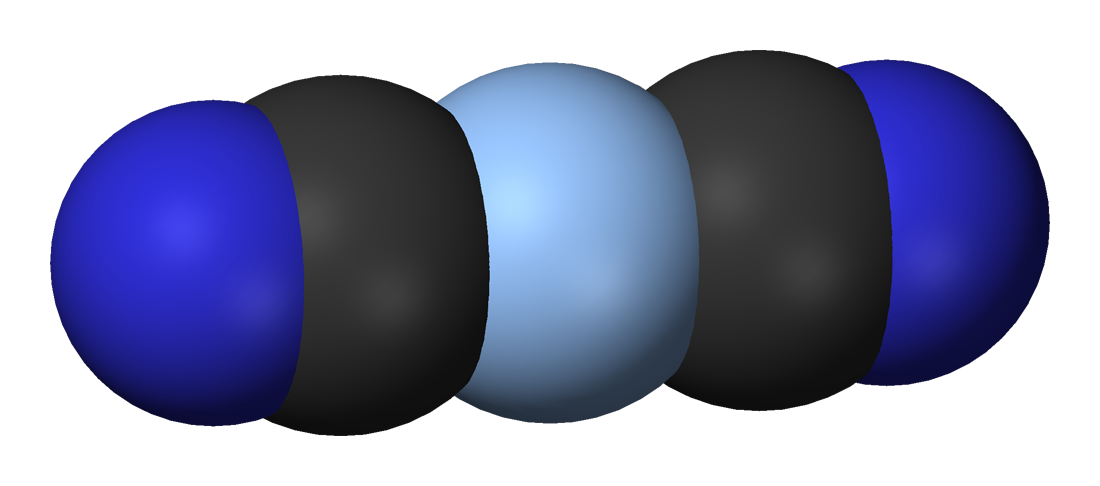

Names
- IUPAC name Potassium dicyanoargentate(I)
- Other names Potassium argentocyanide Potassium silver cyanide

Identifiers
CAS Number	506-61-6
3D model (JSmol)	Interactive image
ChEMBL	ChEMBL3187949
ChemSpider	21241352
ECHA InfoCard	100.007.316
EC Number	208-047-0
PubChem CID	10474
UNII	46KRR09TKY
UN number	1588
CompTox Dashboard (EPA)	DTXSID5024269
- InChI: InChI=1S/2CN.Ag.K/c2*1-2;;/q2*-1;2*+1 Key: RQDBZJVQSLGBMI-UHFFFAOYSA-N
- SMILES: [C-]#N.[C-]#N.[K+].[Ag+]

Properties
Chemical formula	KAg(CN)_{2}
Molar mass	199.001 g/mol
Appearance	White crystals
Density	2.36 g/cm^{3}
Solubility in water	Soluble
Solubility	Insoluble in acids
Refractive index (n_{D})	1.625

Hazards
Safety data sheet (SDS)	CAMEO Chemicals MSDS

Related compounds
Other anions	Potassium dicyanoaurate
- Except where otherwise noted, data are given for materials in their standard state (at 25 °C [77 °F], 100 kPa). verify (what is ?) Infobox references

Potassium dicyanoargentate is an inorganic compound with the formula KAg(CN)_{2}. A white solid, it is the K^{+} salt of the linear coordination complex [Ag(CN)_{2}]^{−}. It forms upon treatment of virtually any silver salt with two equivalents of potassium cyanide.

== Uses and reactions ==
KAg(CN)_{2} is significant adventitious product of gold mining using cyanide as an extractant.

It can be used in silver plating, as a bactericide, and in the manufacture of antiseptics.

It forms a variety of coordination polymers, a property that exploits the bridging tendency of the cyanide ligand.
