= Silver cyanide =

- Silver cyanide 40 grams of silver cyanide on a scale.

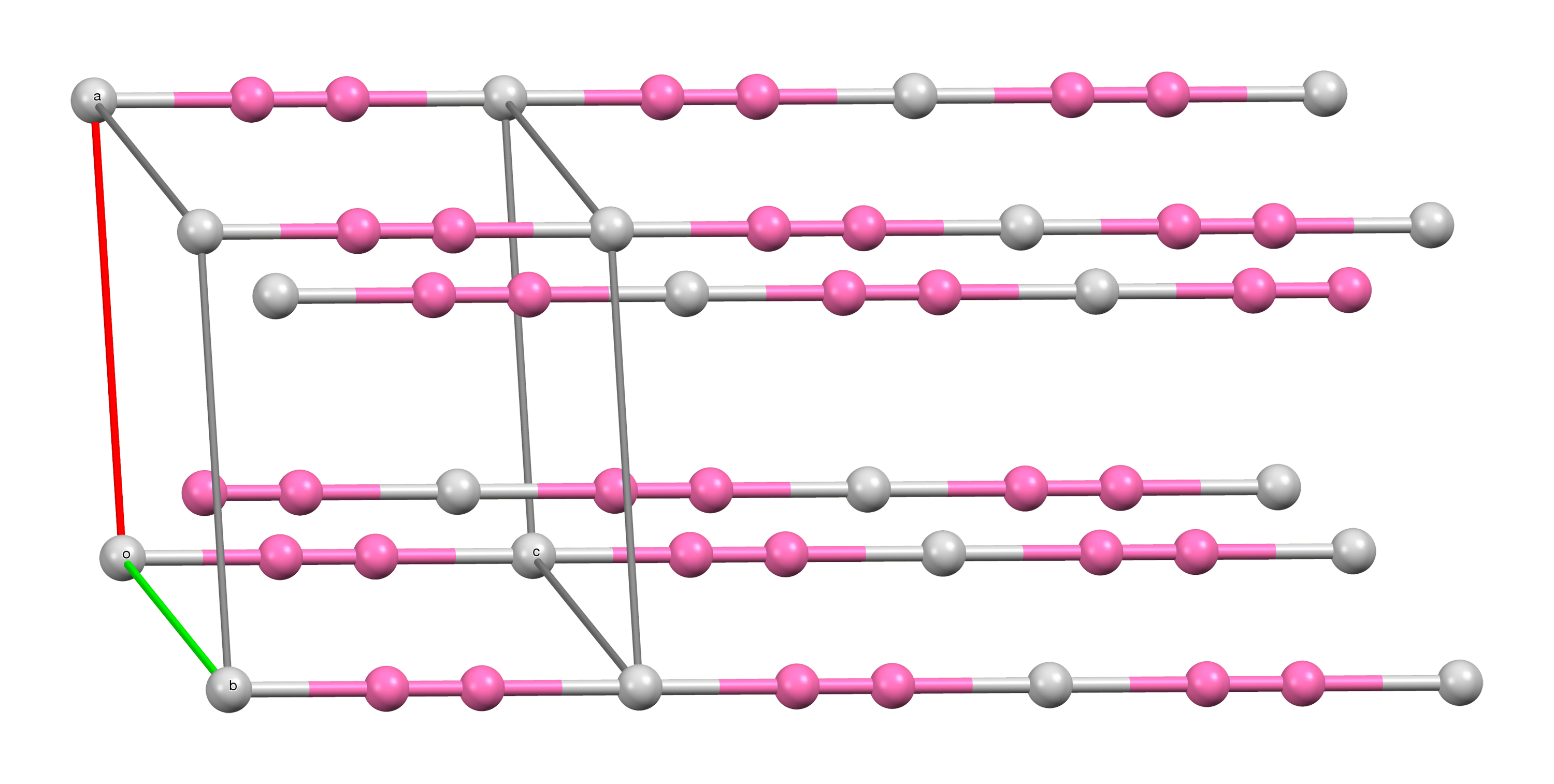
- Structure of silver cyanide

Names
- IUPAC name Silver cyanide
- Other names Argentous cyanide

Identifiers
CAS Number	506-64-9
3D model (JSmol)	Interactive image
ChemSpider	10043
ECHA InfoCard	100.007.317
EC Number	208-048-6
PubChem CID	10475
RTECS number	VW3850000
UNII	33RV6XQ01M
UN number	1684
CompTox Dashboard (EPA)	DTXSID9024306
- InChI: InChI=1S/CN.Ag/c1-2;/q-1;+1 Key: LFAGQMCIGQNPJG-UHFFFAOYSA-N; InChI=1/CN.Ag/c1-2;/q-1;+1 Key: LFAGQMCIGQNPJG-UHFFFAOYAM
- SMILES: [C-]#N.[Ag+]

Properties
Chemical formula	AgCN
Molar mass	133.8856 g/mol
Appearance	colorless, gray (impure) crystals
Odor	odorless
Density	3.943 g/cm^{3}
Melting point	335 °C (635 °F; 608 K) (decomposes)
Solubility in water	0.000023 g/100 mL (20 °C)
Solubility product (K_{sp})	5.97×10^{−17}
Solubility	soluble in concentrated ammonia, boiling nitric acid, ammonium hydroxide, KCN insoluble in alcohol, dilute acid
Magnetic susceptibility (χ)	−43.2·10^{−6} cm^{3}/mol
Refractive index (n_{D})	1.685

Structure
Crystal structure	hexagonal
Coordination geometry	linear

Thermochemistry
Std molar entropy (S^{⦵}_{298})	84 J·mol^{−1}·K^{−1}
Std enthalpy of formation (Δ_{f}H^{⦵}_{298})	146 kJ·mol^{−1}

Hazards
- Occupational safety and health (OHS/OSH)
Main hazards	toxic
- GHS labelling
Pictograms	(GHS05: Corrosive) (GHS06: Toxic) (GHS09: Environmental hazard)
Signal word	Danger
Hazard statements	H290, H300, H310, H315, H318, H330, H410
Precautionary statements	P234, P260, P262, P264, P270, P271, P273, P280, P284, P301+P310, P302+P350, P302+P352, P304+P340, P305+P351+P338, P310, P320, P321, P330, P332+P313, P361, P362, P363, P390, P391, P403+P233, P404, P405, P501
NFPA 704 (fire diamond)	4 1 1
Flash point	320 °C (608 °F; 593 K)
- Lethal dose or concentration (LD, LC)
LD_{50} (median dose)	123 mg/kg (oral, rat)

Related compounds
Other anions	AgCl
Other cations	NaCN; Copper(I) cyanide
- Except where otherwise noted, data are given for materials in their standard state (at 25 °C [77 °F], 100 kPa). verify (what is ?) Infobox references

Silver cyanide is the chemical compound with the formula AgCN. It is a white salt that is precipitated upon treatment of solutions containing Ag^{+} with cyanide, which is used in some schemes to recover silver from solution. Silver cyanide is used in silver-plating.

== Structure ==
The structure of silver cyanide consists of -[Ag-CN]- chains in which the linear two-coordinate Ag^{+} ions are bridged by the cyanide ions, typical of silver(I) and other d^{10} ions. This is the same binding mode as seen in the more famous case of Prussian blue. These chains then pack hexagonally with adjacent chains offset by +/- 1/3 of the c lattice parameter. This is the same as the structure adopted by the high temperature polymorph of copper(I) cyanide. The silver to carbon and silver to nitrogen bond lengths in AgCN are both ~2.06 Å and the cyanide groups show head-to-tail disorder.

== Uses ==
"Cyanidation" is widely used in the isolation of silver from its ores. Partial purification of silver compounds is usually effected by froth flotation. The silver ion is then separated from the skimmed froth with cyanide, yielding a solution of [Ag(CN)_{2}]^{−}. The silver metal can then be plated out by electrolysis of such solutions.

Both AgCN and KAg(CN)_{2} have been used in silver-plating solutions since at least 1840 when the Elkington brothers patented their recipe for a silver-plating solution. A typical, traditional silver-plating solution would contain 15-40 g·L^{−1} KAg(CN)_{2}, 12-120 g·L^{−1} KCN and 15 g·L^{−1} K_{2}CO_{3}.

== Reactions ==
AgCN precipitates upon the addition of sodium cyanide to a solution containing Ag^{+}. On the addition of further cyanide, the precipitate dissolves to form linear [Ag(CN)_{2}]^{−}_{(aq)} and [Ag(CN)_{3}]^{2−}_{(aq)}. Silver cyanide is also soluble in solutions containing other ligands such as ammonia or tertiary phosphines.

Silver cyanides form structurally complex materials upon reaction with other anions. Some silver cyanides are luminescent.

== See also ==
- List of compounds with carbon number 1
