= Berkeley Unified School District =

School district in California, United States

Address
- 2020 Bonar Street Berkeley, California, 94702; United States

District information
- Motto: Excellence; Equity; Engagement; Enrichment
- Superintendent: Enikia Ford-Morthel
- Schools: 20

Students and staff
- Students: 9,800

Other information
- Website: berkeleyschools.net

The Berkeley Unified School District (BUSD) is the public school district for the city of Berkeley, California, United States. The district is managed by the Superintendent of Schools, and governed by the Berkeley Board of Education, whose members are elected by voters. Its administrative offices are located in the old West Campus main building at 2020 Bonar Street, on the corner of Bonar and University Avenue.

== History ==
The Berkeley Unified School District was formed in 1936 by the merger of the city's elementary and high school districts.

District administrative offices were originally (in the late 19th century) at or near the Kellogg School (above Shattuck Avenue between Center Street and Allston Way).

In 1927, a two-story administration building was completed at 2325 Milvia Street (at the corner of Durant Avenue, across from the grounds of Berkeley High School). Designated a seismic hazard after the 1933 Long Beach earthquake, it was put to non-school purposes beginning in 1940 and was razed in 1946, the site becoming tennis courts for the high school.

In January 1940, administrative offices were moved to 1414 Walnut Street, the original Garfield Jr. High, later University Elementary and the temporary site, after the 1923 fire, of Hillside Elementary.

In 1943, Ruth Acty was hired to teach kindergarten at Longfellow school and became the district's first African American teacher.

In 1979, the district offices moved to the Old City Hall at 2134 Martin Luther King Way, and in 2012 to 2020 Bonar Street (originally Luther Burbank Junior High School, then Berkeley High School West Campus, and finally the Berkeley Adult School).

=== Integration policy ===
During and following World War II, the African American population of Berkeley, as in the entire region, increased substantially. However, the practice of racial covenants in property title deeds, together with informal discrimination ("de facto"), had resulted in the black population being concentrated in certain sections of the city, primarily in the southwestern portions. Consequently, public schools serving those areas had a disproportionately high number of blacks while virtually no blacks attended the schools in other mostly white sections of the city. The only exception to this was Berkeley High School as it was, and remains, the only high school for the entire district.

Heightened local interest in the concerns and efforts of the civil rights movement, shared by many in the community, eventually led to the district adopting a school integration plan starting in the mid-1960s. The plan included the use of bussing to effect an integration of all the public schools in Berkeley. The first schools to be integrated under this plan were the junior high schools, Garfield and Willard, starting in the Fall of 1966. A third junior high school, Burbank, was closed, demolished and rebuilt (by 1968) as the high school's "West Campus", serving all the district's 9th-grade students.

Two years later, in the Fall of 1968, the elementary schools were integrated, utilizing the district's own expanded bus fleet.

Berkeley's integration plan, substantially modified, remains in place today. The Berkeley school district has evolved from a race-based to a geography-based integration plan.

== Governance ==
The school district is governed by the Berkeley Board of Education. It consists of five voting members (elected by the city's voters to four-year terms) and two non-voting student directors (elected by the district's high school students).

The current five voting members are Ana Vasudeo, Ka'Dijah Brown, Jennifer Shanoski, Mike Chang, and Jen Corn. In the 2024 election, Laura Babitt lost reelection and was replaced by Corn. Vasudeo was reelected.

The current superintendent is Enikia Ford Morthel.

== Schools ==
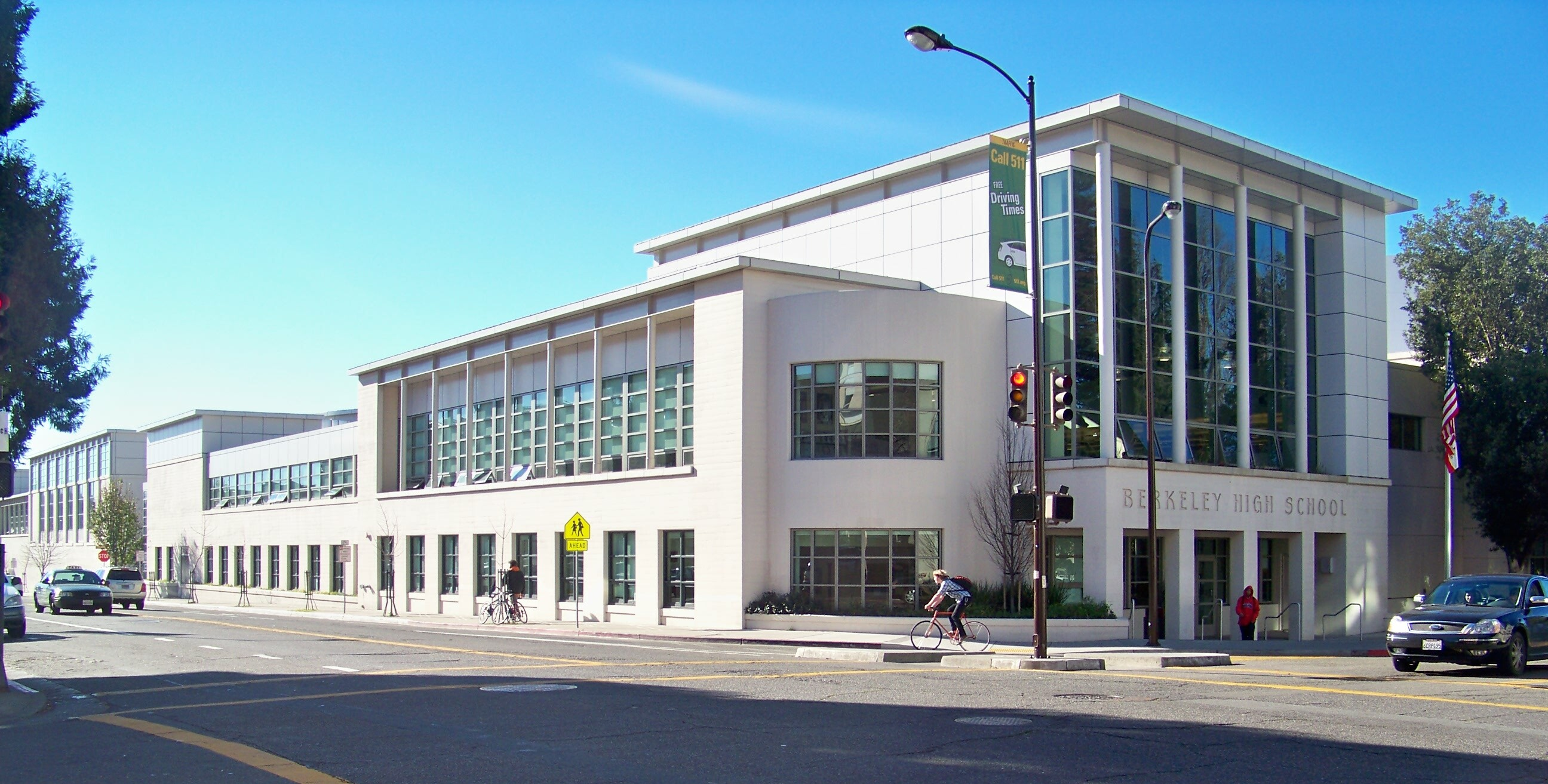
Berkeley High School

=== Early Childhood Education ===
- Franklin Preschool
- Hopkins Preschool
- King Child Development Center

=== Elementary schools ===
- Berkeley Arts Magnet Elementary School at Whittier (formerly Whittier Elementary)
- Cragmont Elementary School
- Emerson Elementary School
- Ruth Acty Elementary School (formerly Jefferson Elementary)
- John Muir Elementary School
- Sylvia Mendez Elementary School (formerly Le Conte Elementary School)
- Malcolm X Arts & Academics Magnet Elementary School (formerly Lincoln Elementary)
- Oxford Elementary School, the smallest school in the BUSD with 262 students in 2024
- Rosa Parks Environmental Science Magnet Elementary School (formerly Columbus Intermediate School)
- Thousand Oaks Elementary School
- Washington Elementary School

=== Middle schools ===
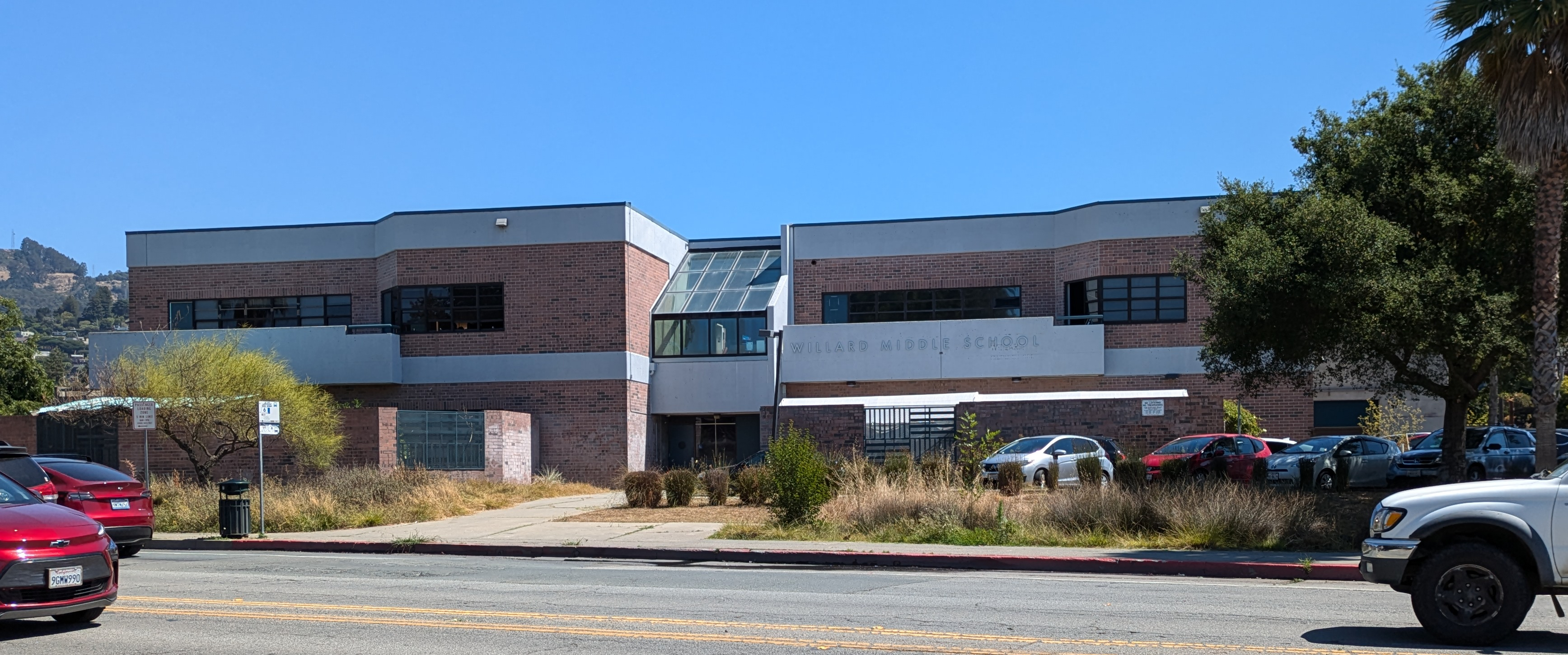
Willard Middle School

- Longfellow Magnet Middle School
- Martin Luther King Jr. Middle School (formerly Garfield Junior High School), site of the Edible Schoolyard project
- Willard Middle School (formerly Willard Junior High School)

=== High schools ===
- Berkeley High School, the largest school in the BUSD with c. 3000 students enrolled each year.
- Berkeley Technology Academy (Continuation High School)

=== Adult schools ===
- Berkeley Adult School
  Berkeley Adult School
  Location
  - 1701 San Pablo Avenue; Berkeley, California; United States
  Information
  - Former names: Berkeley Evening School
  - Type: Public adult school
  - Established: 1881
  - School district: Berkeley Unified School District
  - Campus type: Urban

==== About ====
Berkeley Adult School (BAS) began in 1881 as the Berkeley Evening School and was originally located at Berkeley High School, with additional evening trade classes held at Burbank Junior High and Edison Junior High.

By the 1960s, the school had moved to the McKinley/East Campus site and later, in 1971, to the former Savo Island federal housing area. Following the closure of West Campus Berkeley High School (formerly Burbank Junior High), the school was relocated there. In 2004, the Berkeley Adult School moved to its current location at the former site of Franklin Elementary School, which was also the site of Berkeley's first public school, established in 1856.

BAS maintains a cafeteria that serves baked goods prepared by students in its culinary program.

=== Former Schools ===
- Burbank Jr. High School (closed 1966; original structure demolished and replaced; reopened as West Campus-Berkeley High School)
- East Campus, Berkeley High School (first located at renamed McKinley Continuation School, relocated to temporary buildings at former Savo Island federal housing site (Derby at Grove) in 1971; closed after Spring 2001, replaced by Berkeley Alternative High School)
- Edison Junior High School (located on Oregon Street and Russell at King Street; became the Instructional Materials Center for the district, remodeled after a major fire in August, 1970)
- Franklin Elementary School (closed 2002; re-opened as Berkeley Adult School; originally was the site of the oldest school in Berkeley, the Ocean View School, established in 1856, renamed the San Pablo Avenue School in 1879, later renamed Franklin)
- Grizzly Peak Primary School (formerly Little Hillside Primary School) (closed 1981)
- Hillside Elementary School (closed 1983)
- Kellogg Primary School (1880–1910, Berkeley's second public school, located at Center and Oxford; Berkeley High School was located on the grounds from 1880 to 1900; after Kellogg closed, its buildings were rented to the California College of Arts and Crafts from 1911 to 1921; subsequently razed)
- Lorin School
- McKinley Continuation School, constructed in 1896 as the Dwight Way School for grades 1 through 8. Renamed McKinley School in 1902 for the assassinated president. McKinley became a junior high school in 1909. In the 1930s, it became a continuation high school. The property was bought by the University of California and leased back to the school district. It was renamed as the East Campus of Berkeley High in late 1960s; building razed, site became part of the Rochdale Apartments student housing cooperative)
- Rose Street School
- Tilden Primary School (formerly Cragmont Primary School; closed 1981)
- University Elementary School (opened in 1922–23 at 1414 Walnut Street in a building originally housing Garfield Junior High, and in later years, the site of the Berkeley Unified School District's headquarters building now located at the former West Campus)
- West Campus, Berkeley High School (closed 1986; became the site of the Berkeley Adult School until 2004; since 2012, the site of the administrative offices of the district)

== See also ==
- List of school districts in Alameda County, California
