= German International School of Silicon Valley =

German International School of Silicon Valley (GISSV)
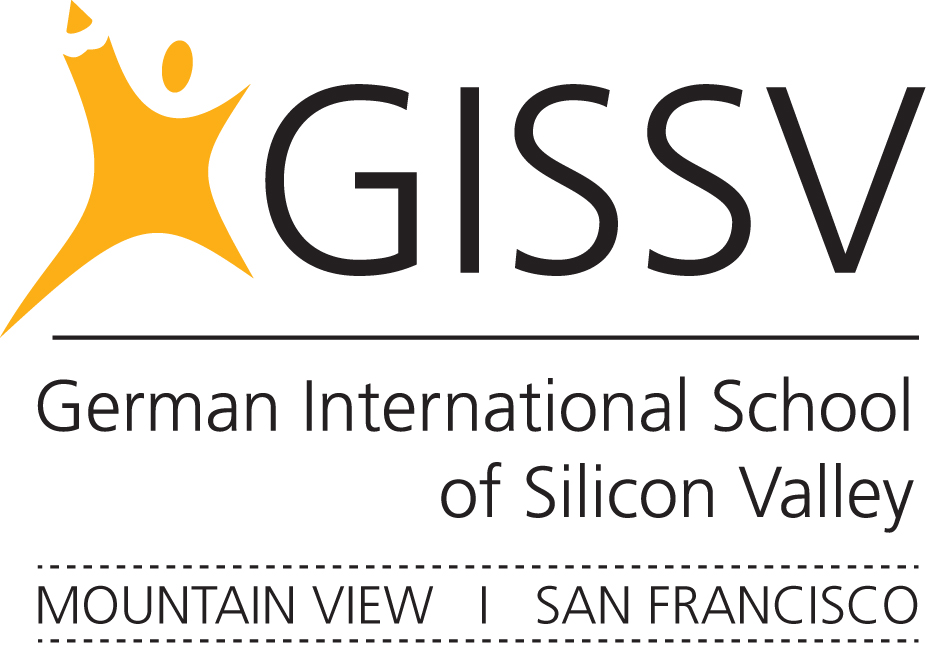

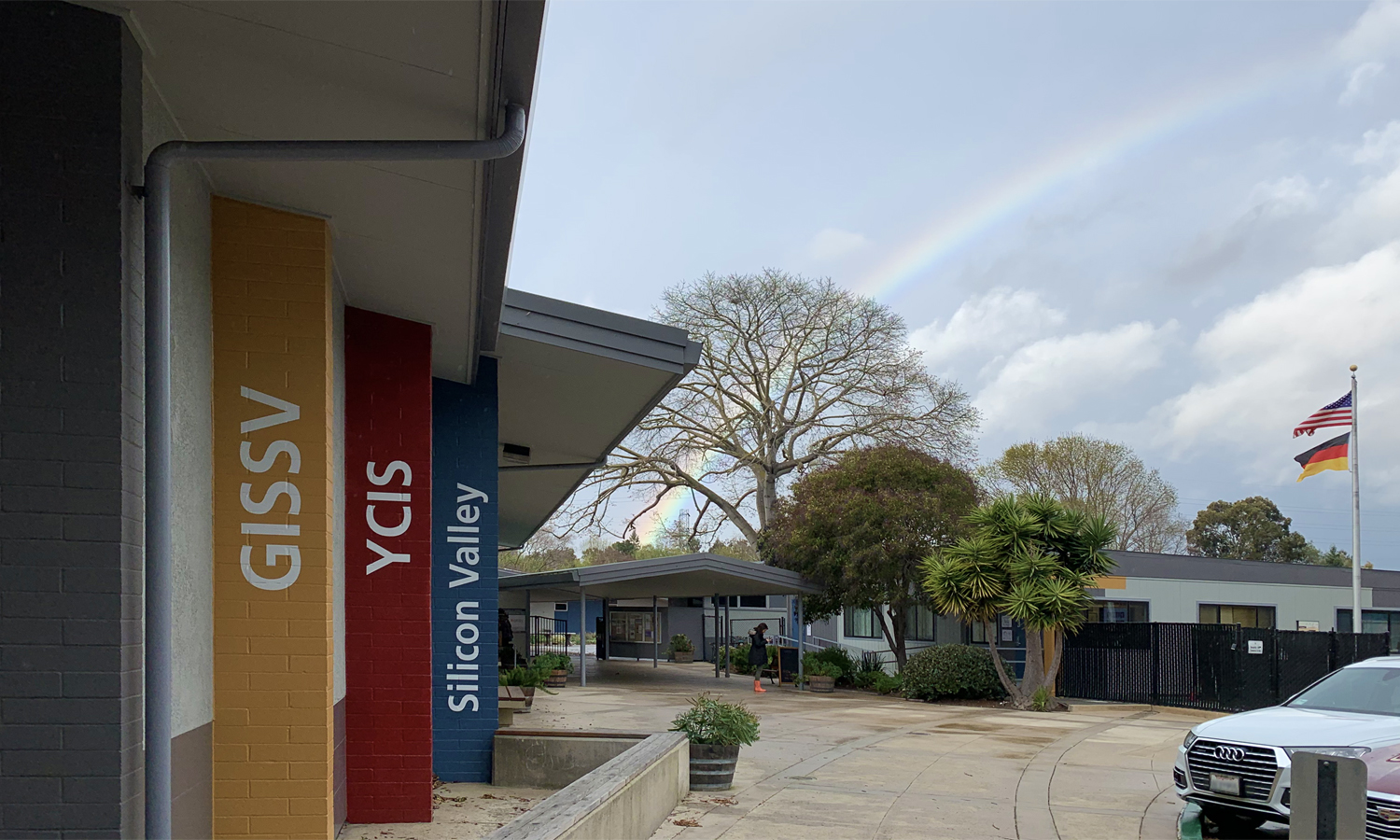
- Mountain View campus in January 2020.
- Mountain View, San Francisco, California; United States

Information
- Type: Official German School Abroad
- Established: 1999
- Grades: Preschool – 12th grade
- Website: www.gissv.org

The German International School of Silicon Valley (GISSV) is a private school educating children from preschool to grade 12 using bilingual full immersion. It has sites in Mountain View and San Francisco in California. Students graduate the school with both the German International Abitur and the California High School Diploma. The school is accredited with the Western Association of Schools (WASC), as well as the California Association of Independent Schools (CAIS) and by the German government (Central Agency for German Schools Abroad, ZfA) as an official German School Abroad (Deutsche Auslandsschule).

== History ==
The German School of Silicon Valley (GSSV) was formed in November 1999 as a spin-out of the German American International School (today Alto International School), based in Menlo Park, California. Classes started in February 2000 with 34 students. In July 2000, the school moved to the site of the former Whisman Elementary School in Mountain View. Two years later, the GSSV obtained a 20-year lease with the city of Mountain View.

In 2003, the GSSV officially changed its name to German International School of Silicon Valley (GISSV).

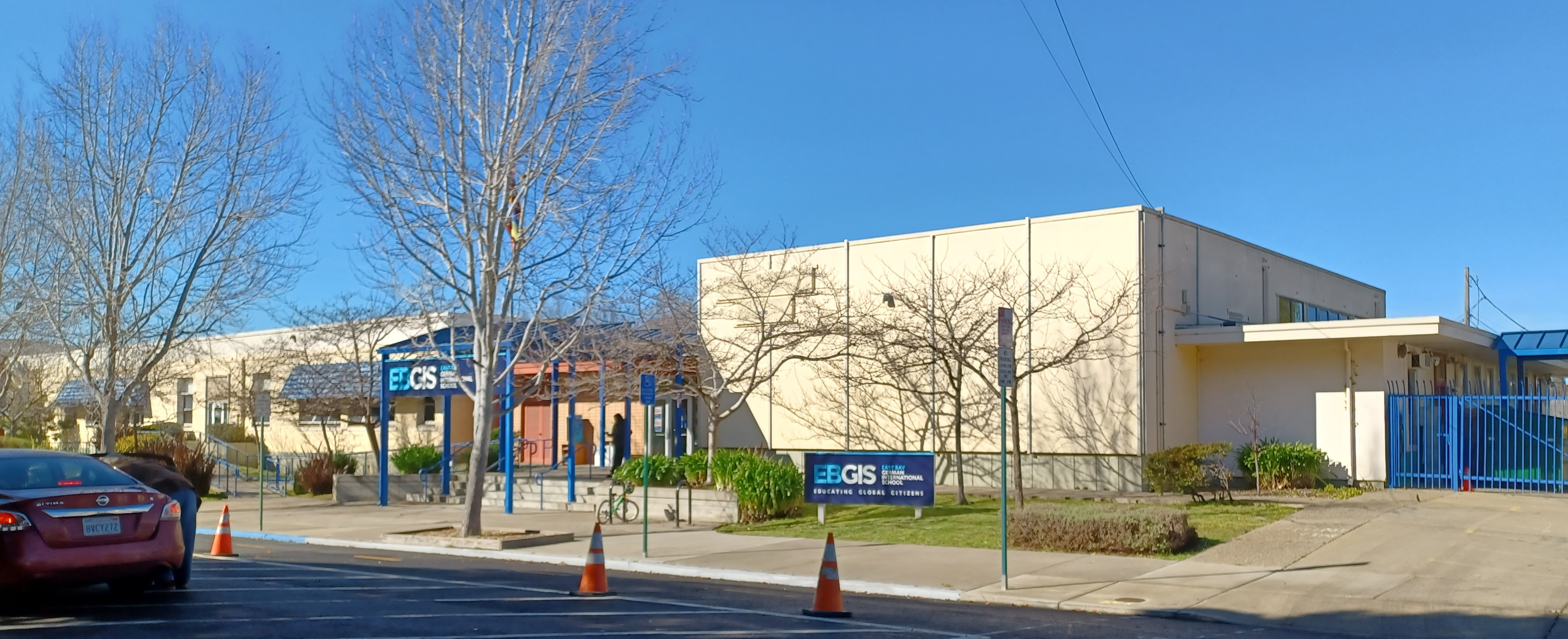
East Bay German International School in Emeryville, California

GISSV opened a Berkeley/East Bay campus* in August 2007, after a parent-led task force identified a number of families interested in German-English bilingual education in the East Bay. In the spring of 2018, the campus separated from GISSV and is operating now as East Bay German International School, a locally managed, independent school.

In August 2011, GISSV opened the campus in San Francisco, located in the Presidio. This campus started with a Kindergarten class in fall 2011 in one of the typical historic Craftsman buildings. The school grew constantly adding one grade per year, having a full K-8 program in the 2019/20 school year. GISSV added a third building to the campus in the school year 2016/17 but outgrew the location eventually. A new location was founded in the Castro - starting school operations in August 2020 with a Preschool-8 program.

== Locations ==
- Mountain View (310 Easy Street)
- San Francisco (117 Diamond Street)

=== Former Berkeley/East Bay Campus ===
GISSV opened a Berkeley campus in August 2007, after a parent-led task force identified a number of families interested in German-English bilingual education in the East Bay. The parents teamed up with the existing GISSV in Mountain View and jointly opened an East Bay/Berkeley campus as an extension of the existing Preschool-12 program. First operating in Kensington, the school moved in 2012 to the historic Hillside Elementary School, which was built as a public school in 1925 in Berkeley.

Because of the cost of seismic and other needed retrofit work, the school was moved from Berkeley to a new location, the former Anna Yates School in Emeryville, California, in 2016. In the spring of 2018, its board separated it from GISSV. From the 2018/2019 school year, it is operating as East Bay German International School, a locally managed, independent school.
