= Armstrong College (California) =

Defunct private college in Berkeley, California

Armstrong College (originally the California School for Private Secretaries, also known as Armstrong Business College) is a defunct college that was active for 70 years and historical building in Berkeley, California. The former school building is at 2210 Harold Way and is a listed Berkeley Landmark (no. 187) by the City of Berkeley since September 6, 1994.

== History ==
The college was founded in 1918 by J. Evan Armstrong of the University of California and he served as the school's president. The first location of the school was a small building on Shattuck Avenue. In 1923, the name changed to Armstrong College, and the campus relocated. Walter Ratcliff was an architect for its school buildings in 1923, for the second location.

A plaque commemorates the school's history. Alumni include Jovy Marcelo and Annie Wu.

The college moved to 1608 Webster St, Oakland CA in the 90's and changed names to become "Armstrong University", granting bachelors and masters degrees in business to mostly international students. The library catalog was created in those years under an LSTA grant. A purchase by a Chinese company, which ended regional academic accreditation, was a precursor to the closing of the institution.

=== Closure ===
For about 10 years it served as a training facility for the University of California, Berkeley. It was then acquired in 2009 by the Tibetan Nyingma Meditation Center, and renamed Dharma College.
