= John Stewart MacArthur =

Scottish chemist

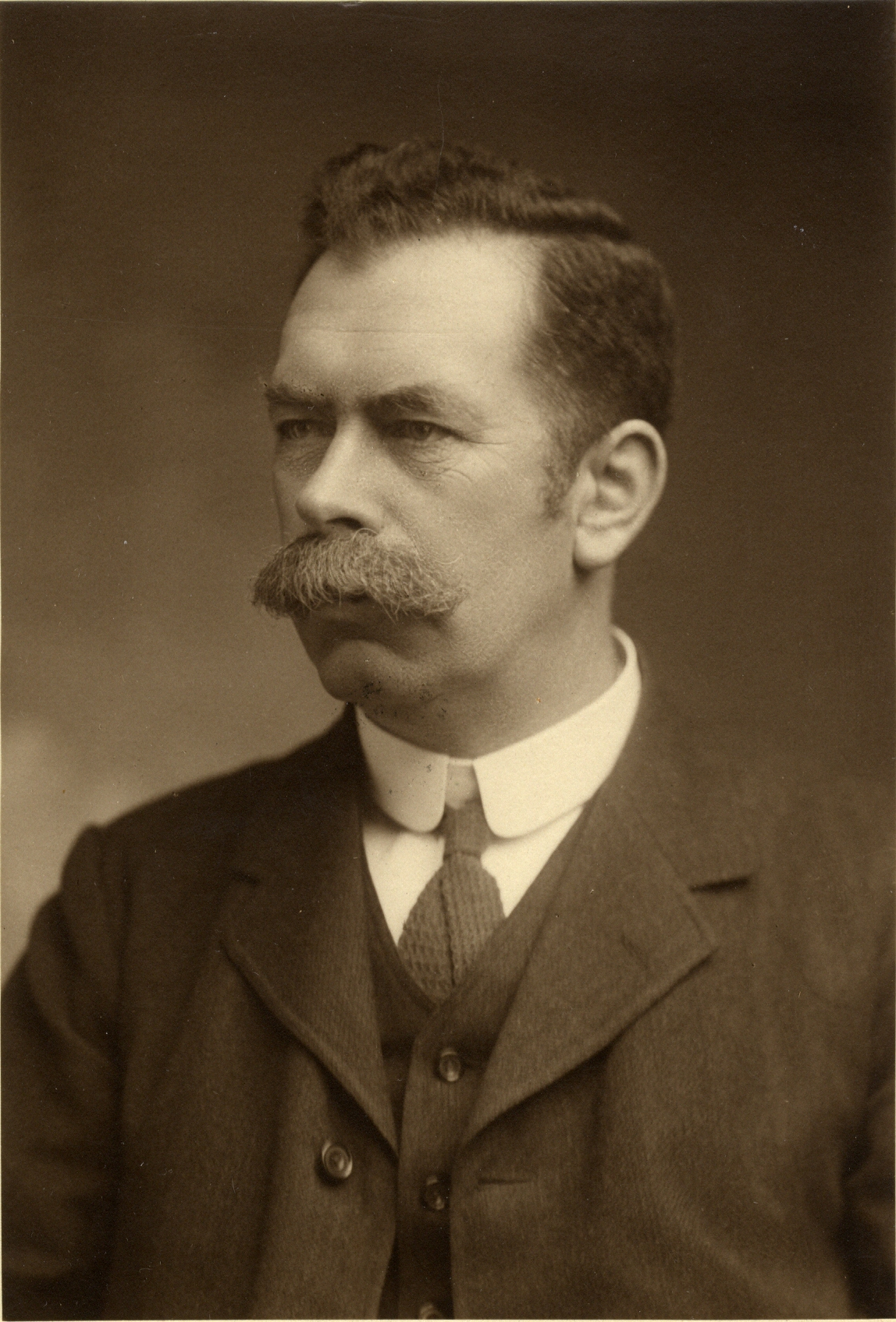
John Stewart MacArthur, photographed by Elliott & Fry

John Stewart MacArthur was a chemist from Glasgow. Born on 9 December 1856, he is credited with the development of the MacArthur-Forrest cyanidation process in 1887, used to extract gold in South Africa. His patent for the process was voided. With the long-lasting legal issues about the cyanidation patents, MacArthur turned to other businesses. First, he investigated vanadium extraction from ore containing significant amounts of radium. From this enterprise he turned to the production of radium. He founded the Radium Works in Halton in 1911. In 1915 he moved it to Balloch, West Dunbartonshire and renamed it as Loch Lomond Radium Works. MacArthur died on 16 March 1920, aged 63.

== See also ==
- Gold cyanidation
