= Merrill–Crowe process =

Metallurgical process

The Merrill–Crowe Process is a separation technique for removing gold from the solution obtained by the cyanide leaching of gold ores. It is an improvement of the MacArthur-Forrest process, where an additional vacuum is managed to remove air in the solution (invention of Crowe), and zinc dust is used instead of zinc shavings (improvement of Merrill).

The solution is separated from the ore by methods such as filtration (e.g. vertical leaf type clarifier filters) and counter current decantation (CCD). Afterwards a very clear solution is achieved by using pre-coated filters applying diatomaceous earth. Oxygen is then removed by passing the solution through a vacuum de-aeration column. Zinc dust is added to the clarified, de-aerated solution which precipitates the gold; zinc having a higher affinity for the cyanide ion than gold. Other precious metals, silver, and base metals, like copper, will also precipitate, if present.

Automated membrane filtration offers a cost savings alternative to CCD. Both applications are compared in detail by K. McGrew, 2016.

The gold precipitate (mixed with zinc dust) is then filtered out of the solution, and the zinc dust and gold are mixed with sulfuric acid to dissolve the zinc. The solution is filtered, and the remaining solids are smelted to a gold dore bar. These bars are sent to a refinery to remove the copper and silver, the specific process used depending upon the impurities in the gold.

The basic process was discovered and patented by Charles Washington Merrill around 1900, and later refined by Thomas Bennett Crowe, working for the Merrill Company.

== See also ==
- Other gold cyanidation techniques:
  - Carbon in pulp
  - Electrowinning
  - Filter press
