= Gold cyanidation =

Technique for extracting gold from low-grade ore

Gold cyanidation (also known as the cyanide process or the MacArthur–Forrest process) is a hydrometallurgical technique for extracting gold from low-grade ore through conversion to a water-soluble coordination complex. It is the most commonly used leaching process for gold extraction. Cyanidation is also widely used in silver extraction, usually after froth flotation.

Production of reagents for mineral processing to recover gold represents 70% of cyanide consumption globally. While other metals, such as copper, zinc, and silver, are also recovered using cyanide, gold remains the primary driver of this technology. The highly toxic nature of cyanide has led to controversy regarding its use in gold mining, with it being banned in some parts of the world. However, when used with appropriate safety measures, cyanide can be safely employed in gold extraction processes. One critical factor in its safe use is maintaining an alkaline pH level above 10.5, which is typically controlled using lime in industrial-scale operations. Lime plays an essential role in gold processing, ensuring that the pH remains at the correct level to mitigate risks associated with cyanide use.

== History ==
In 1783, Carl Wilhelm Scheele discovered that gold dissolved in aqueous solutions of cyanide. Through the work of Bagration (1844), Elsner (1846), and Faraday (1847), it was determined that each gold atom required two cyanide ions, i.e. the stoichiometry of the soluble compound.

=== Industrial process ===
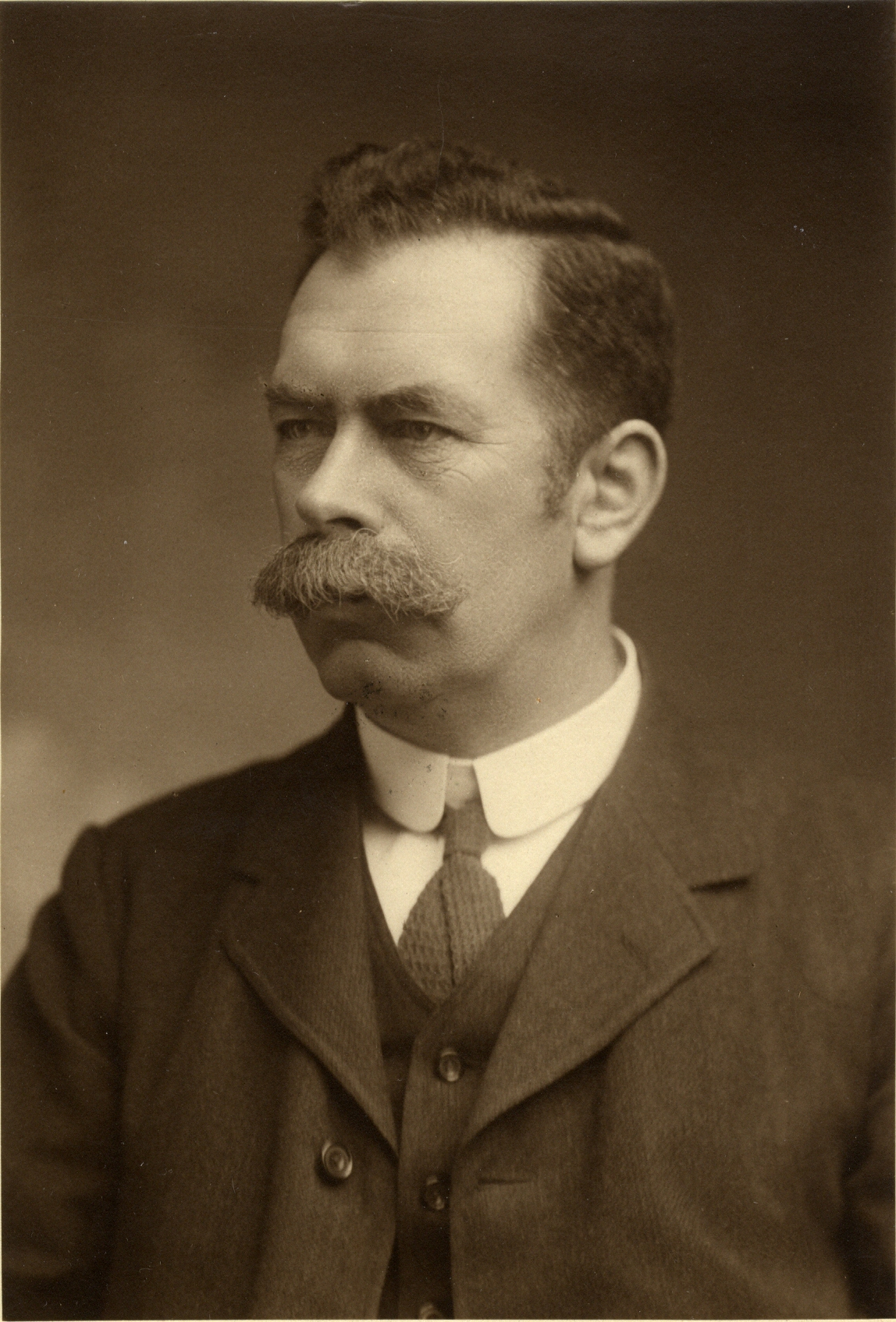
John Stewart MacArthur developed the cyanide process for gold extraction in 1887.

The expansion of gold mining in the Rand of South Africa began to slow down in the 1880s, as the new deposits found tended to contain pyritic ore. The gold could not be extracted from this compound with any of the then available chemical processes or technologies. In 1887, John Stewart MacArthur, working in collaboration with brothers Robert and William Forrest for the Tennant Company in Glasgow, Scotland, developed the MacArthur–Forrest process for the extraction of gold from gold ores. Several patents were issued in the same year. By suspending the crushed ore in a cyanide solution, a separation of up to 96 percent pure gold was achieved. The process was first used on the Rand in 1890 and, despite operational imperfections, led to a boom of investment as larger gold mines were opened up.

By 1891, Nebraska pharmacist Gilbert S. Peyton had refined the process at his Mercur Mine in Utah, "the first mining plant in the United States to make a commercial success of the cyanide process on gold ores." In 1896, Bodländer confirmed that oxygen was necessary for the process, something that had been doubted by MacArthur, and discovered that hydrogen peroxide was formed as an intermediate. Around 1900, the American metallurgist Charles Washington Merrill (1869–1956) and his engineer Thomas Bennett Crowe improved the treatment of the cyanide leachate, by using vacuum and zinc dust. Their process is the Merrill–Crowe process.

== Chemical reactions ==
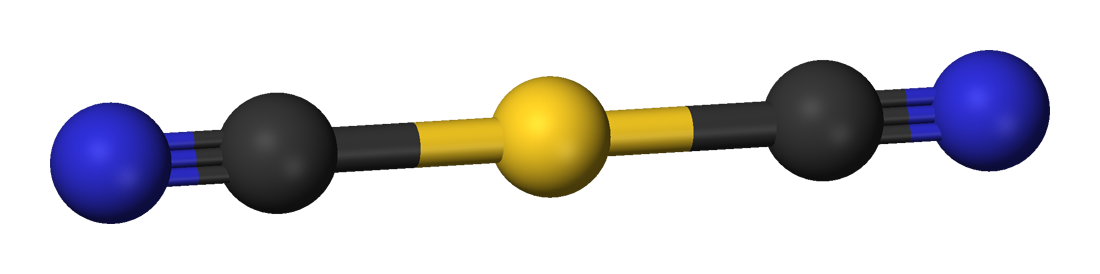
Ball-and-stick model of the aurocyanide or dicyanoaurate(I) complex anion, [Au(CN)_{2}]^{−}

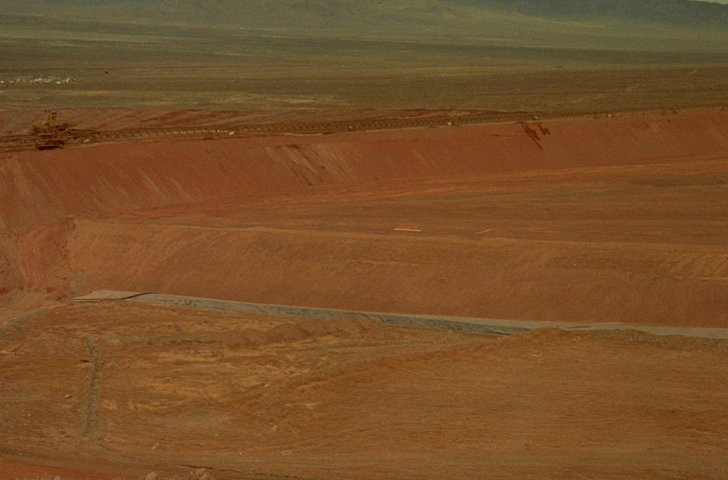
Cyanide leaching "heap" at a gold mining operation near Elko, Nevada

The chemical reaction for the dissolution of gold, the "Elsner equation", follows:

4 Au + 8 NaCN + O_{2} + 2 H_{2}O → 4 Na[Au(CN)_{2}] + 4 NaOH

Potassium cyanide and calcium cyanide are sometimes used in place of sodium cyanide.

Gold is one of the few metals that dissolves in the presence of cyanide ions and oxygen. The soluble gold species is dicyanoaurate. from which it can be recovered by adsorption onto activated carbon.

== Application ==
The ore is comminuted using grinding machinery. Depending on the ore, it is sometimes further concentrated by froth flotation or by centrifugal (gravity) concentration. Water is added to produce a slurry or pulp. The basic ore slurry can be combined with a solution of sodium cyanide or potassium cyanide; many operations use calcium cyanide, which is more cost effective.

To prevent the creation of toxic hydrogen cyanide during processing, slaked lime (calcium hydroxide) or soda (sodium hydroxide) is added to the extracting solution to ensure that the acidity during cyanidation is maintained over pH 10.5 - strongly basic. Lead nitrate can improve gold leaching speed and quantity recovered, particularly in processing partially oxidized ores.

=== Effect of dissolved oxygen ===
Oxygen is one of the reagents consumed during cyanidation, accepting the electrons from the gold, and a deficiency in dissolved oxygen slows leaching rate. Air or pure oxygen gas can be purged through the pulp to maximize the dissolved oxygen concentration. Intimate oxygen-pulp contactors are used to increase the partial pressure of the oxygen in contact with the solution, thus raising the dissolved oxygen concentration much higher than the saturation level at atmospheric pressure. Oxygen can also be added by dosing the pulp with hydrogen peroxide solution.

=== Pre-aeration and ore washing ===
In some ores, particularly those that are partially sulfidized, aeration (prior to the introduction of cyanide) of the ore in water at high pH can render elements such as iron and sulfur less reactive to cyanide, therefore making the gold cyanidation process more efficient. Specifically, the oxidation of iron to iron (III) oxide and subsequent precipitation as iron hydroxide minimizes loss of cyanide from the formation of ferrous cyanide complexes. The oxidation of sulfur compounds to sulfate ions avoids the consumption of cyanide to thiocyanate (SCN^{−}) byproduct.

== Recovery of gold from cyanide solutions ==
In order of decreasing economic efficiency, the common processes for recovery of the solubilized gold from solution are (certain processes may be precluded from use by technical factors):

- Carbon in pulp
- Electrowinning
- Merrill–Crowe process

== Cyanide remediation processes ==
The cyanide remaining in tails streams from gold plants is potentially hazardous. Therefore, some operations process the cyanide-containing waste streams in a detoxification step. This step lowers the concentrations of these cyanide compounds. The INCO-licensed process and the Caro's acid process oxidise the cyanide to cyanate, which is not as toxic as the cyanide ion, and which can then react to form carbonates and ammonia:

CN^{−} + [O] → OCN^{−}
OCN^{−} + 2 H_{2}O → HCO^{−}_{3} + NH_{3}

The Inco process can typically lower cyanide concentrations to below 50 mg/L, whereas the Caro's acid process can lower cyanide levels to between 10 and 50 mg/L, with the lower concentrations achievable in solution streams rather than slurries. Caro's acid – peroxomonosulfuric acid (H_{2}SO_{5}) - converts cyanide to cyanate. Cyanate then hydrolyses to ammonium and carbonate ions. The Caro's acid process is able to achieve discharge levels of Weak Acid Dissociable" (WAD) cyanide below 50 mg/L, which is generally suitable for discharge to tailings. Hydrogen peroxide and basic chlorination can also be used to oxidize cyanide, although these approaches are less common. Typically, this process blows compressed air through the tailings while adding sodium metabisulfite, which releases SO_{2}. Lime is added to maintain the pH at around 8.5, and copper sulfate is added as a catalyst if there is insufficient copper in the ore extract. This procedure can reduce concentrations of WAD cyanide to below the 10 ppm mandated by the EU's Mining Waste Directive. This level compares to the 66-81 ppm free cyanide and 500-1000 ppm total cyanide in the pond at Baia Mare. Remaining free cyanide degrades in the pond, while cyanate ions hydrolyse to ammonium. Studies show that residual cyanide trapped in the gold-mine tailings causes persistent release of toxic metals (e.g. mercury ) into the groundwater and surface water systems.

== Effects on the environment ==
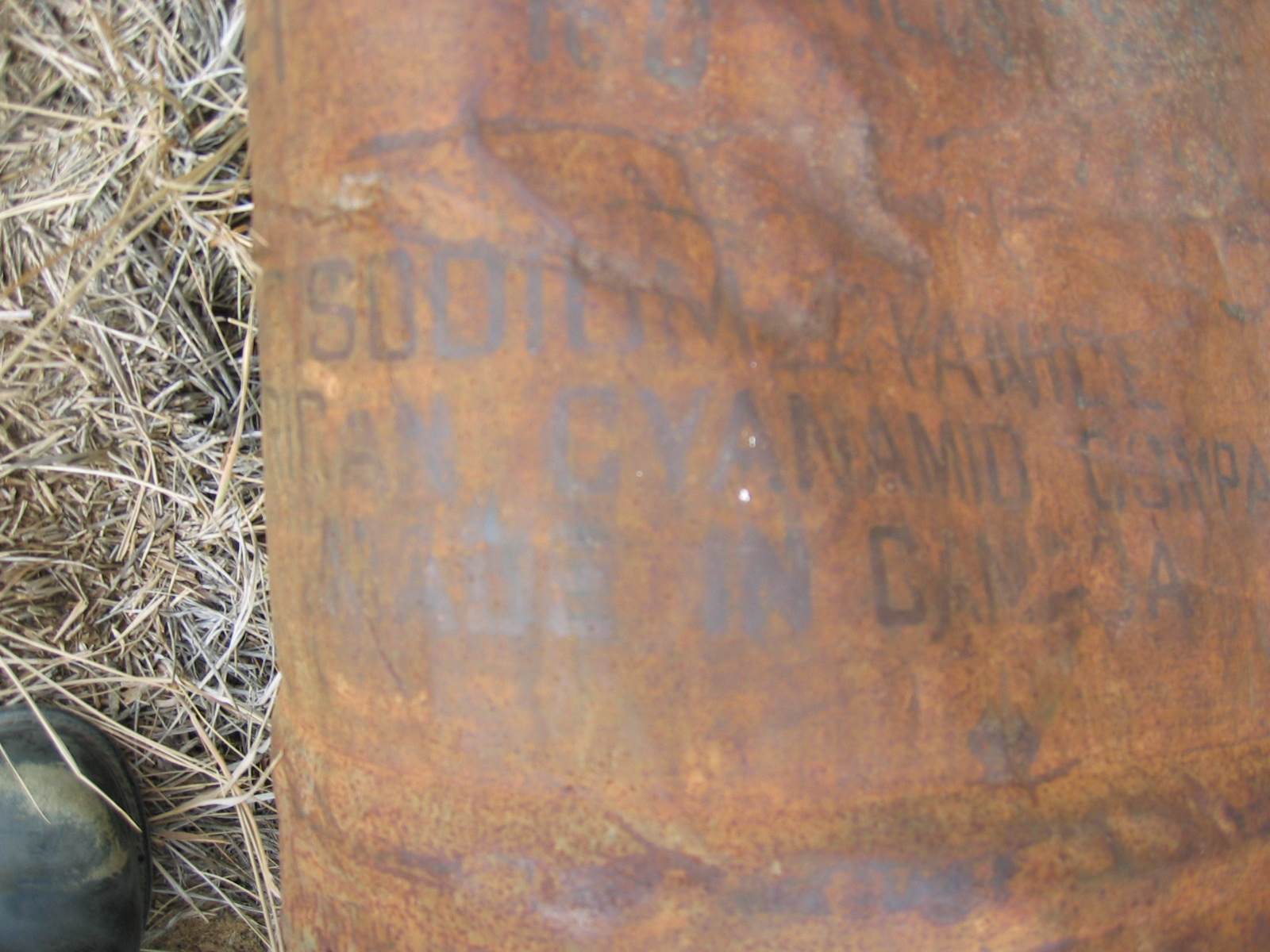
Sodium cyanide drum at the abandoned Chemung Mine in Masonic, California

Despite being used in 90% of gold production: gold cyanidation is controversial due to the toxic nature of cyanide. Most environmental issues have been associated with accidental spills. Although aqueous solutions of cyanide degrade rapidly in sunlight, the less-toxic products, such as cyanates and thiocyanates, may persist for some years. Cyanide spills have killed few people — humans can be warned not to drink or go near polluted water, but cyanide spills can have a devastating effect on rivers, sometimes killing everything for several miles downstream. The cyanide could be washed out of river systems and, as long as organisms can migrate from unpolluted areas upstream, affected areas can soon be repopulated. Longer term impact and accumulation of cyanide in riparian or limnological benthos and environmental fate is less clear. According to Romanian authorities, in the Someș river below Baia Mare, the planktons returned to 60% of normal within 16 days of the spill; the numbers were not confirmed by Hungary or Yugoslavia. Other cyanide spills include:

| Year | Mine | Country | Incident |
|---|---|---|---|
| 1985–1991 | Summitville | US | Leakage from leach pad |
| 1980s–present | Ok Tedi | Papua New Guinea | Unrestrained waste discharge |
| 1995 | Omai | Guyana | Collapse of tailings dam |
| 1998 | Kumtor | Kyrgyzstan | Truck drove over bridge |
| 2000 | Baia Mare | Romania | Collapse of containment dam (see 2000 Baia Mare cyanide spill) |
| 2000 | Tolukuma | Papua New Guinea | Helicopter dropped crate into rainforest |
| 2018 | San Dimas | Mexico | Truck leaked 200 liters of cyanide solution into the Piaxtla River in Durango |
| 2024 | Eagle Mine | Canada (Yukon) | Heap Leach failure, cyanide spill into surrounding waterways, ecological damage and company bankruptcy |

Such spills have prompted fierce protests at new mines that involve use of cyanide, such as Roşia Montană in Romania, Lake Cowal in Australia, Pascua Lama in Chile, and Bukit Koman in Malaysia.

== Alternatives to cyanide ==
Although cyanide is cheap, effective, and biodegradable, its high toxicity and increasingly poor impact on a mine's political and social license to operate, has incentivized alternative methods for extracting gold. Other extractants have been examined including thiosulfate (S_{2}O_{3}^{2−}), thiourea (SC(NH_{2})_{2}), iodine/iodide, ammonia, liquid mercury, and alpha-cyclodextrin. Challenges include reagent cost and the efficiency of gold recovery, although some chlorination process using sodium hypochlorite (household bleach) have shown promise in terms of reagent regeneration. These technologies are at a pre-commercialisation stage and compare favourably to equivalent cyanidation methods, including gold recovery percentage. Thiourea has been implemented commercially for ores containing stibnite. Yet another alternative to cyanidation is the family of glycine-based lixiviants.

== Legislation ==
The US states of Montana and Wisconsin, the Czech Republic, Hungary, have banned cyanide mining. The European Commission rejected a proposal for such a ban, noting that existing regulations (see below) provide adequate environmental and health protection. Several attempts to ban gold cyanidation in Romania were rejected by the Romanian Parliament. There are currently protests in Romania calling for a ban on the use of cyanide in mining (see 2013 Romanian protests against the Roșia Montană Project).

In the EU, industrial use of hazardous chemicals is controlled by the so-called Seveso II Directive (Directive 96/82/EC, which replaced the original Seveso Directive (82/501/EEC brought in after the 1976 dioxin disaster. "Free cyanide and any compound capable of releasing free cyanide in solution" are further controlled by being on List I of the Groundwater Directive (Directive 80/68/EEC) which bans any discharge of a size which might cause deterioration in the quality of the groundwater at the time or in the future. The Groundwater Directive was largely replaced in 2000 by the Water Framework Directive (2000/60/EC).

In response to the 2000 Baia Mare cyanide spill, the European Parliament and the Council adopted Directive 2006/21/EC on the management of waste from extractive industries. Article 13(6) requires "the concentration of weak acid dissociable cyanide in the pond is reduced to the lowest possible level using best available techniques", and at most all mines started after 1 May 2008 may not discharge waste containing over 10ppm WAD cyanide, mines built or permitted before that date are allowed no more than 50ppm initially, dropping to 25ppm in 2013 and 10ppm by 2018.

Under Article 14, companies must also put in place financial guarantees to ensure clean-up after the mine has finished. This in particular may affect smaller companies wanting to build gold mines in the EU, as they are less likely to have the financial strength to give these kinds of guarantees.

The industry has come up with a voluntary "Cyanide Code" that aims to reduce environmental impacts with third party audits of a company's cyanide management.
