= Charles Washington Merrill =

American engineer

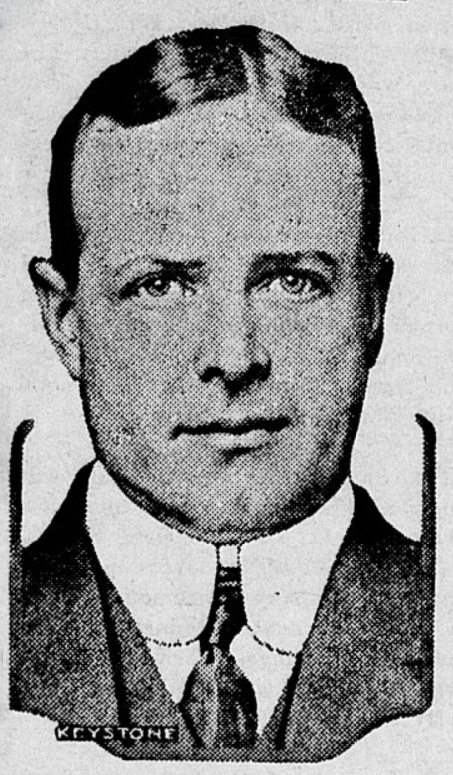
Charles W. Merrill

Charles Washington Merrill (December 21, 1869 – February 5, 1958) was an American mining metallurgist.

== Biography ==
He was born in Concord, New Hampshire, to Sylvester and Clara L. (née French) Merrill. He attended elementary and high school in Alameda, California, and then attended the College of Mining of the University of California, where he received a Bachelor of Science in 1891.

After his graduation he was first connected with the noted old Standard Consolidated mine in Bodie, California, and from there went to the Harqua Hala mine in Arizona, thence to the Montana Mining Company in Marysville, California. In 1899, he became affiliated with the widely known Homestake Mining Company of South Dakota as a metallurgist, and in this capacity he manifested the brilliant talents which became the foundation of his future career. He became extensively known by his work, and acquired material prosperity, and his creation of new methods, particularly in the process of extracting gold from ore (the Merrill-Crowe process), brought to him wide fame. It is an established fact that he added to the value of the effective reserve in the ore property of the Homestake mine alone approximately twenty million dollars (1930's dollars).

After he achieved his success in South Dakota, Merrill organized the Merrill Company in San Francisco in 1910, for the purpose of exploiting his patents in the cyanide process. He held over 25 patents in the United States and foreign countries relative to metallurgical processes and mining apparatus. From 1924-25 he served as a regent of the University of California and also served as president of the Alumni Association.

During World War I he accepted the position of chief of the Division of Collateral Commodities in the Food Administration at the request of Herbert Hoover. In World War II his various enterprises were called upon by the Armed Services to extend and vary their endeavors and processes as their part in aiding the war effort.

On February 9, 1898, he married Clara Scott Robinson, daughter of Dr. W.N. and Clara (née Hawkins) Robinson in Alameda, California. They had four children; Beatrice, John, Gregor, and Bruce. The family made its home in Berkeley, California, in a home designed by architect Julia Morgan until the 1930s, when expansion by the University of California forced them to relocate to Orinda, California, to the house known as the Charles W. Merrill House.

Merrill died on February 5, 1956, of a stroke at the age of 86 while on a trip to Honolulu, Hawaii.
