= Potassium dicyanoaurate =

Inorganic compound (K[Au(CN)2])

Names
- IUPAC name Potassium dicyanoaurate(I)
- Other names potassium cyanoaurate potassium gold cyanide potassium gold dicyanide

Identifiers
| CAS Number | 13967-50-5 |
| 3D model (JSmol) | ionic form: Interactive image; coordination form: Interactive image |
| Beilstein Reference | 6235525 |
| ChEBI | CHEBI:30057 |
| ChemSpider | 19988798 |
| ECHA InfoCard | 100.034.303 |
| EC Number | 237-748-4 |
| Gmelin Reference | 37363 |
| PubChem CID | 159710 |
| UNII | 54L0T2BQF5 |
| UN number | 1588 |
| CompTox Dashboard (EPA) | DTXSID8044549 |
- InChI: InChI=1S/2CN.Au.K/c2*1-2;;/q2*-1;2*+1 Key: XTFKWYDMKGAZKK-UHFFFAOYSA-N
- SMILES: ionic form: [C-]#N.[C-]#N.[K+].[Au+]; coordination form: N#C[Au-]C#N.[K+]

Properties
| Chemical formula | KAu(CN)_{2} |
| Molar mass | 288.101 g/mol |
| Appearance | white crystal |
| Density | 3.45 g/cm^{3} |
| Boiling point | decomposes |
| Solubility in water | 140 g/L |

Structure
| Crystal structure | Rhombohedral, hR54, No. 148 |
| Space group | R3̅ |
| Lattice constant | a = 0.728 nm, b = 0.728 nm, c = 2.636 nm |
| Lattice volume (V) | 1.2099 nm^{3} |
| Formula units (Z) | 9 |

Hazards
- Occupational safety and health (OHS/OSH)
| Main hazards | toxic |
- GHS labelling
| Pictograms | (GHS05: Corrosive) (GHS06: Toxic) (GHS09: Environmental hazard) |
| Signal word | Warning |
| Hazard statements | H290, H300, H310, H315, H317, H318, H330, H410 |
| Precautionary statements | P260, P264, P273, P280, P284, P301+P310 |

Related compounds
| Other anions | Potassium argentocyanide |
- Except where otherwise noted, data are given for materials in their standard state (at 25 °C [77 °F], 100 kPa). Infobox references

Potassium dicyanoaurate (or potassium gold cyanide) is an inorganic compound with formula K[Au(CN)_{2}]. It is a colorless to white solid that is soluble in water and slightly soluble in alcohol. The salt itself is often not isolated, but solutions of the dicyanoaurate ion ([Au(CN)_{2}]^{−}) are generated on a large scale in the extraction of gold from its ores.

== Production ==
In mining of gold from dilute sources, gold is selectively extracted by dissolution in aqueous solutions of cyanide, provided by dissolving sodium cyanide, potassium cyanide and/or calcium cyanide. The reaction for the dissolution of gold, the "Elsner Equation", is:

4 Au + 8 KCN + O_{2} + 2 H_{2}O → 4 K[Au(CN)_{2}] + 4 KOH

In this process, oxygen is the oxidant.

It can also be produced by reaction of gold(I) salts with excess potassium cyanide.

AuCl + 2 KCN → K[Au(CN)_{2}] + KCl

== Structure ==
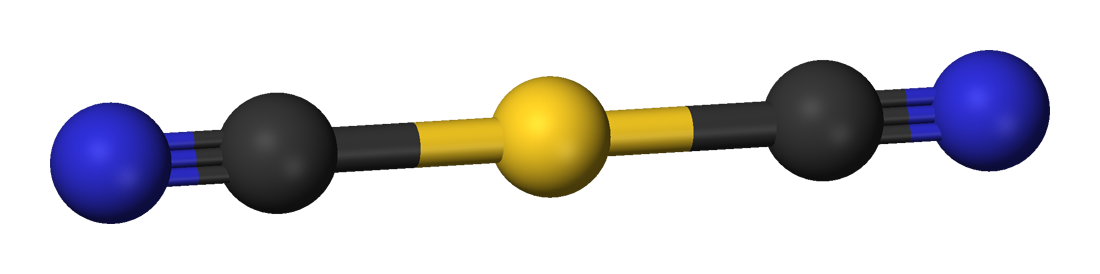
dicyanoaurate is a rod-shaped anion.

Potassium dicyanoaurate is a salt. The dicyanoaurate anion is linear according to X-ray crystallography. On the basis of infrared spectroscopy, the dicyanoaurate anion adopts a very similar structure in sodium dicyanoaurate (NaAu(CN)_{2}).

== Uses ==
Dicyanoaurate is the soluble species that is the focus of gold cyanidation, the hydrometallurgical process for winning gold from dilute ores. In fact, sodium cyanide, not the potassium salt, is more widely used in commercial processes.

Aside from its major use as an intermediate in the extraction of gold, potassium dicyanoaurate is often used in gold plating applications.

== Related compounds ==
The compound containing gold(III) cyanide is also known: potassium tetracyanoaurate(III), K[Au(CN)_{4}]. Its use is less common.

The potassium ion can be replaced with quaternary ammonium cations as in tetrabutylammonium dicyanoaurate.

== Safety ==
The ingestion of gram quantities of potassium dicyanoaurate can lead to death due to gold that inhibits enzyme rhodanese, which the body uses to detoxify cyanide.
