= Gold laundering =

Melting and recasting of gold to hide its origin

Gold laundering is the process whereby illegally obtained gold is melted and recast into another form. The recasting is performed to obscure or conceal the true origin of the gold. The recast gold is then sold, thus laundering it into cash.

It may also refer to a money laundering transaction in which the exchanged good is gold.

== Process ==
There are several stages in the gold laundering process. The first is the acquisition of the gold, which may be from any combination of sources, at least one of which is illegal. This is then treated as scrap metal, melted, then cast into a mold. This results in a transportable ingot, gold bar or other bulk form bullion.

In some cases, there is no gold involved in the laundering scheme. Colombia reported 70 tons of gold exports for 2012 despite production of only 15 tons. This is a result of fictitious gold exports filed with the Colombian customs agency by drug cartels to import "cash from international drug deals".

=== Acquisition ===
Acquisition of gold occurs in many forms.

Small-scale gold mining operations, particularly those with no permits or licences, extract gold from areas unsuitable for large mining operations. Gold obtained in this fashion that is exported may not be traced or authenticated. This includes artisanal mines operated by a few individuals, who then sell the gold to brokers.

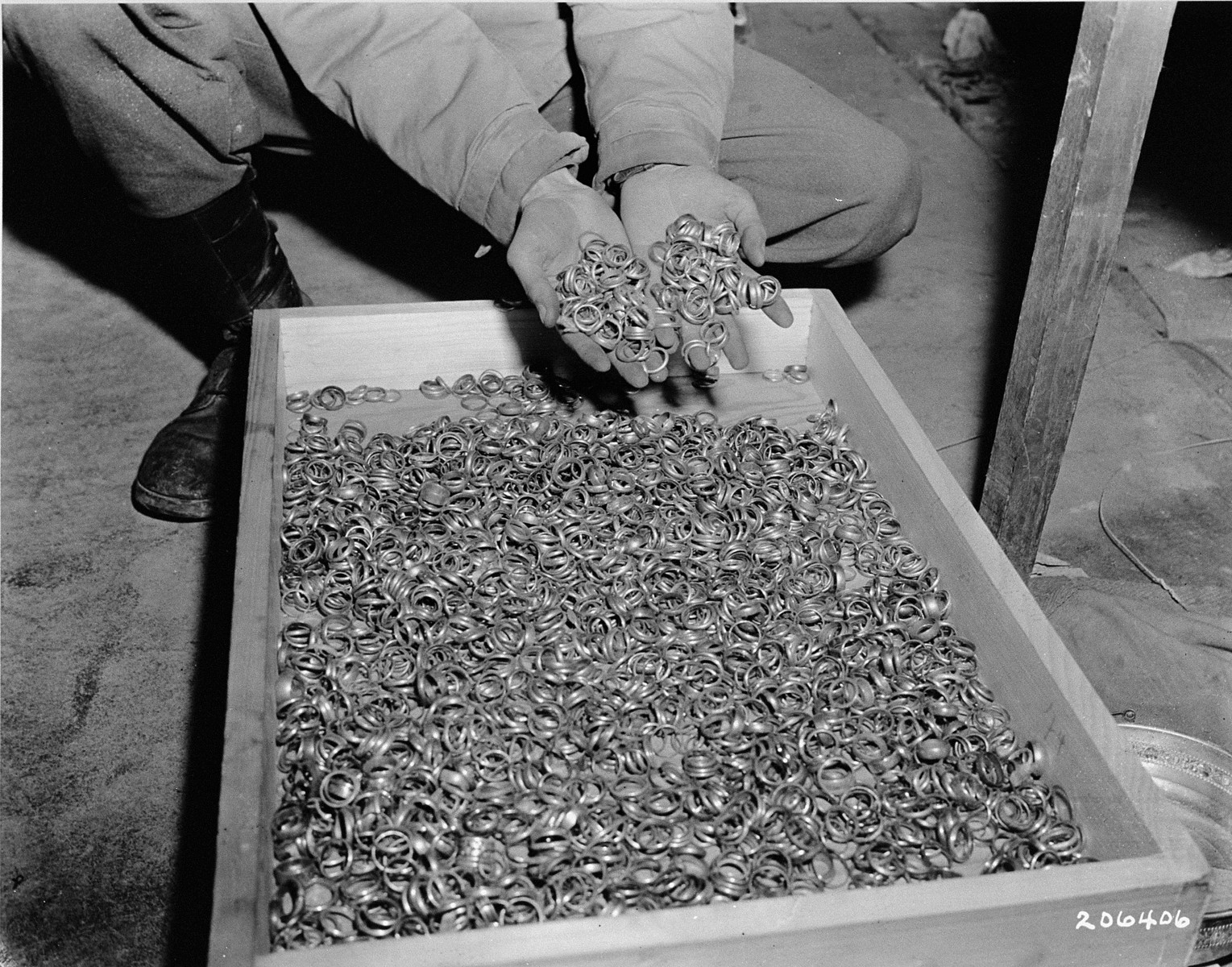
As Minister of Economics, Walther Funk accelerated the pace of rearmament and as Reichsbank president banked for the SS the gold rings of Nazi concentration camp victims

Another form of acquisition is theft. In the 1940s, Nazi Germany forcibly obtained the possessions of Jews, sometimes in collaboration with other parties. Most victims who died in death camps and Nazi concentration camps were robbed of all valuable property by the state, which was then sold or, in the case of bullion, sent to the Reichsbank. For example, in 1945 the Hungarian Gold Train was established to transport the property of Hungarian Jews to Berlin. Once the Jews had been deported to German concentration camps, the valuables were sorted into categories such that their owners could no longer be identified. In the late 1930s and throughout World War II, Germany would increase its unofficial gold reserves by expropriating gold from foreign governments, including $223m from Belgium and $193m from the Netherlands. Some of the Nazi gold was exchanged for cash, and some deposited in financial institutions, including $316 million of the looted gold at the Swiss National Bank. Of the nearly 100 tons of gold laundered through Swiss banks, only 4 tons were returned. The Banco de Portugal, the central bank of Portugal, would regularly purchase Nazi gold held at the Swiss National Bank, according to a 1944 document from the American Overseas Special Services.

=== Refining ===
The scrap gold is then sold by brokers to smelters or refiners, who heat the gold to at least 1,064 °C (1,947 °F), its melting point. This may include gold from numerous sources, including recycled and newly mined gold. Once melted, it may be purified by parting, which separates silver impurities, and the Miller process or Wohlwill process, depending on the desired level of purity and scale of operation.

Once refined, it is cast into a transportable form for further processing. Gold fingerprinting, that is identifying a particular source of gold based on its impurities or trace elements, may be possible if the impurities have not been removed via refining.

== Effects ==
To prevent the laundering of gold and other metals (such as tantalum, tin, and tungsten), some nations have established systems and regulations. For example, Rwanda introduced regulations for mineral trade that require all ore extraction to be tagged, in part a response to the Dodd–Frank Wall Street Reform and Consumer Protection Act in the United States that requires companies to disclose the use of conflict minerals by publishing a supply chain audit.

However, with only 100 government monitors overseeing 450 mining sites during typical business hours, smuggling still occurs, exacerbated by corrupt monitors illegally selling tags or failing to record transactions in logbooks.

In 2013, Ghanaian President John Dramani Mahama announced that the government of Ghana would establish a task force to regulate the small-scale mining sector. This was to ensure that gold produced in small-scale mines could be authenticated, and also to eliminate the use of heavy machinery that had become prevalent on such sites, which have caused environmental damage.

The government of Uganda obtained $200 million in trade revenue from the sale of gold in 2012, but expects that to decrease in 2013 as a result of illegal mining operations.

The group InSight Crime claims that illegal mining represents up to 30% of the revenues of the Revolutionary Armed Forces of Colombia (FARC).

On 22 November 2000, the World Jewish Congress lawsuit against Swiss banks was settled, providing a fund of $1.25 billion for restitution to individuals whose property was confiscated by the Nazis during World War II.

== See also ==
- Gold as an investment
- Moscow gold
