= Bottom-blown oxygen converter =

Smelting furnace

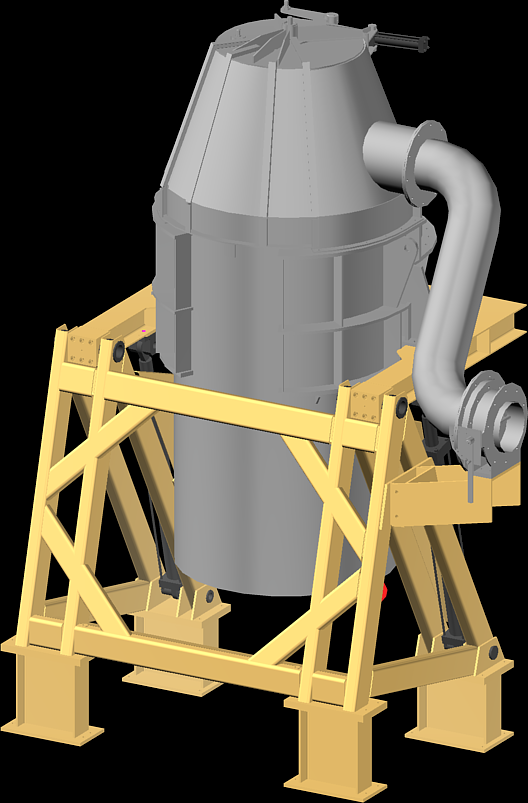
Figure 1. Drawing of a BBOC mounted on its tilting frame

The Bottom-blown Oxygen Converter or BBOC is a smelting furnace developed by the staff at Britannia Refined Metals Limited (“BRM”), a British subsidiary of MIM Holdings Limited (which is now part of the Glencore group of companies). The furnace is currently marketed by Glencore Technology. It is a sealed, flat-bottomed furnace mounted on a tilting frame that is used in the recovery of precious metals. A key feature is the use of a shrouded lance to inject oxygen through the bottom of the furnace, directly into the precious metals contained in the furnace, to oxidize base metals or other impurities as part of their removal as slag.

== Introduction ==
Ores mined for their base metal content often contain precious metals, usually gold and silver. These have to be removed from the base metals as part of the refining processes used to purify the metals. In the case of copper electrolytic refining, the gold and silver fall to the bottom of the electrolytic refining cell as “slimes” that are subsequently treated to recover gold and silver as byproducts. In the case of lead refining, silver, gold, and other precious metals are typically removed using the Parkes process, in which zinc is added to the impure lead bullion to collect the silver, gold and other precious metals.

The BRM lead refinery at Northfleet in England uses the Parkes process followed by liquation and a vacuum induction retort to recover precious metals. The product of this process is a feed for the BBOC consisting of a mixture of lead, silver (60–75%), zinc (2–3%) and copper (2–3%), with trace amounts of gold. Prior to the development of the BBOC, BRM used cupellation in a 15 tonne (“t”) reverberatory cupellation furnace to recover the precious metals from this mixture. Three of these furnaces were used to produce 450 t of silver per year.

Cupellation works by exposing the mixture at high temperature to air or oxygen. The base metals, being less noble than silver and gold, react with the oxygen to form their oxides, which separate from the noble metals to form a slag that floats on the top of the residual metals (or “doré”). At BRM, the doré contains 99.7% silver.

To maximize the oxygen transfer from the blast air in the reverberatory furnace, a shallow bath is used, thus increasing the surface-area-to-volume ratio of the furnace.

A problem with using reverberatory furnaces for cupellation is that the zinc oxidizes first, forming a crust across the top of the molten material. This crust prevents the penetration of oxygen to the rest of the material, and so it has to be manually broken up and removed using a rabble bar. This is both labor-intensive and also results in the loss of some of the silver. Similarly, the oxidized lead slag has to be removed when it forms to maintain the operation, and its removal also results in loss of silver.

The BBOC was developed by BRM personnel as a way of reducing these and other problems, such as low energy efficiency and low oxygen utilization, associated with the reverberatory cupellation process.

== Description ==
The BBOC furnace is a cylindrical steel vessel with a protective internal lining of refractory bricks. It is mounted on a tilting frame that allows it to be held at different angles at different stages of its operating cycle (see Figure 2). A hood is fixed over the top of the furnace, providing a seal that prevents lead and other fumes from escaping during the furnace’s operation (see Figure 1).

The key feature of the BBOC is the shrouded lance that passes through the refractory bricks at the bottom of the furnace. This lance allows oxygen to be injected directly into the molten metal contained in the furnace, away from the refractory lining. Doing so allows the region of high reaction rates to be removed from the vicinity of the lining, thus reducing its wear.

By injecting the oxygen directly into the bath, rather than blowing it on top (as in the case of the reverberatory cupellation furnace or top-blown rotary converters), the oxygen transfer efficiency is not impeded by the presence of the slag layer. It results in an oxygen utilization efficiency approaching 100%.

The lack of interference in the oxygen transfer by the slag layer has a couple of key benefits. The first is that the increased certainty in the estimation of oxygen utilization efficiency means that it is easier to calculate the endpoint of the process, making process control much easier. The second is that a thicker slag layer can be tolerated (because the oxygen does not have to pass through it), and this means that the losses of silver to the slag are reduced (because it is the silver at the interface between the metal and slag that becomes entrained during the removal of the slag and the thicker the slag layer, the smaller the silver content of the removed slag). BRM reported a decrease in the silver content of the BBOC slag compared to the reverberatory furnace slag of 50%.

BRM found that the reaction rate of the BBOC was 10–20 times that of its reverberatory cupellation furnace.

Refractory wear in the BBOC is largely confined to the slag line, at the top of the metal, where attack by litharge (lead oxide) is greatest. This is combated by using fused-grain, direct-bonded magnesite-chrome bricks to line the inside of the furnace shell.

== Operation ==
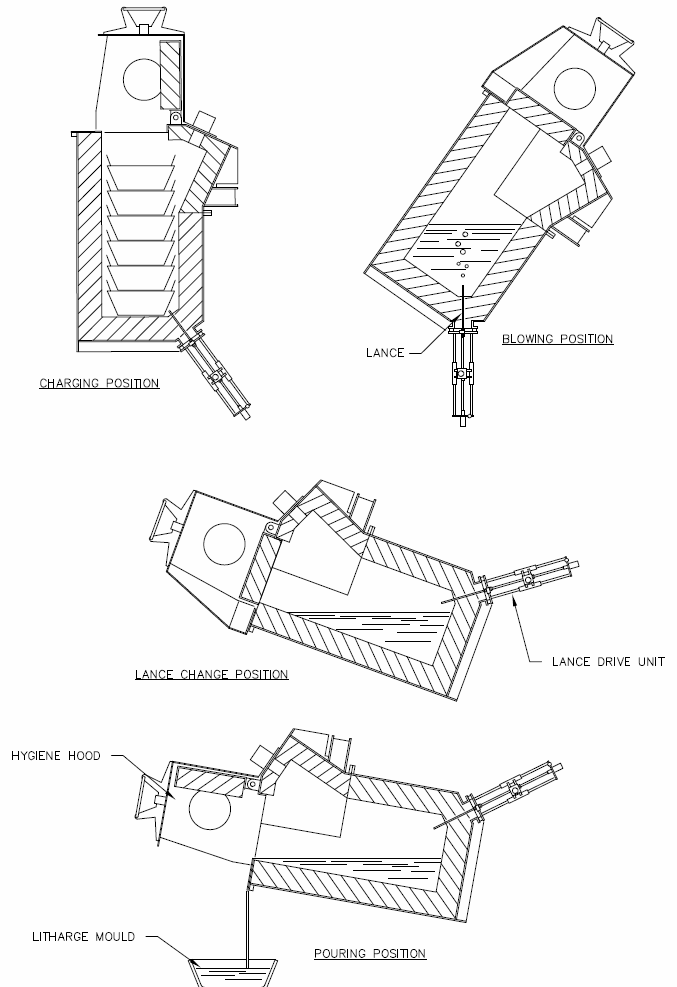
Figure 2. Operating positions of the BBOC

Figure 2 shows the positions of the BBOC at various stages of the operating cycle.

The BBOC is held in an upright position during the charging stage. A solid or liquid charge is added using an overhead crane. The furnace is then tilted forward so that the lance is above the charge, and the charge is melted using an oil or natural gas burner that is inserted near the top of the furnace. Once the charge has been melted, the furnace is tilted back into the blowing position and oxygen is blown into the bath. Slag formed from the oxidation of lead and zinc is removed periodically by tilting the furnace forward again and pouring it off.

The oxygen flow rate during blowing for a three tonne capacity furnace is 20–30 Nm^{3}/h. Zinc is initially oxidized to form a zinc oxide dross on the surface of the charge, but as lead oxide subsequently forms, a fluid slag of zinc and lead oxides is created. Most of the copper is removed at the same time as the lead. The final removal of copper to a level of 0.04% is undertaken at the end of the process by further additions of lead to collect the copper.

If the lance needs to be replaced at any time during operation, this is done by tilting the furnace forward until the lance is above the surface of the bath, where it can be removed and replaced without the contents of the furnace draining through the hole in the furnace lining.

The cupellation process finishes when the silver is about 99.7% pure. At this point, the silver is poured from the furnace and transferred to another furnace, where a flux is added to upgrade and remove the oxygen from the silver to produce market bullion of 99.9% purity.

== History ==
=== Early development at BRM ===
Staff at BRM began work on an alternative to the conventional reverberatory cupellation furnace in the early 1980s. This included a review of the available technology, including the top-blown rotary converter ("TBRC"), on which test work was undertaken.

One of the first areas investigated was the use of oxygen-enriched blast air in the reverberatory furnace. This was “found to be of marginal benefit and not economically viable."

The BRM staff subsequently tried to increase the oxygen transfer rate by using lances submerged in the bath of the reverberatory furnace and found that there was some benefit in doing this. However, the wear rate of the lances was excessive and it was realized that the basic design of the furnace, with its shallow bath, was not conducive to the development of a high-intensity reactor.

The concept then evolved into a new furnace design, one that had a deep bath, in contrast to the reverberatory furnace design.

Initial tests of the bottom injection of oxygen were carried out on a small scale at Imperial College, London, using a nitrogen-shrouded tuyere. These showed that under certain conditions a protective accretion would form at the tip of the injector, and that oxygen utilization was high, with the oxidation reactions generating sufficient heat to keep the furnace hot until the final stages of refining when the impurity levels were low.

Additionally, the test work on the TBRC had shown that it had a high rate of refractory wear, due to the washing action of the slag caused by the rotation of the furnace, which provided additional pressure to develop an alternate process. The TBRC test work also resulted in low oxygen utilization (about 60%).

Based on the success of the small-scale tests, and with calculations indicating that the new design would have significant energy savings over the reverberatory furnace, the BRM staff built a 1.5 t pilot plant with a working volume of 150 liters (“L”). The oxygen injector was a fixed tuyere, located at corner of the base with the side wall, with an annular nitrogen shroud.

The initial pilot plant tests showed that it was difficult to maintain the protective accretion that had been generated in the small-scale tests, due to the variation in temperature and bullion composition that occurred throughout the cupelling cycle. Without the accretion, the nitrogen shroud could not provide sufficient protection to the injector, and it burned back to the level of the refractory lining, which resulted in damage to the lining.

The solution eventually developed was the concept of the moveable lance system in place of the fixed tuyere that had been used initially. The lance was pushed further into the furnace as its tip was worn away.

The initial lance advancing system was manual, but the current automated system was subsequently developed.

Once a sustainable system had been developed in the pilot plant, and after three years of pilot plant development, a commercial, 3 t-scale BBOC was commissioned at BRM in 1986. Its use reduced the fuel consumption per tonne of silver by 85%, from 30 gigajoules per tonne (“GJ/t”) to 4.5 GJ/t and the exhaust gas volume from 32 000 Nm^{3}/h to 7500 Nm^{3}/h.

=== Commercialization ===
After the successful operation of the BBOC at BRM, MIM Holdings Limited (“MIM”) decided to license the technology to other smelter and refinery operators. Early adopters included Hindustan Zinc Limited, which by 1995 had two 1 t BBOC plants operating in India, and ASARCO Inc., which was operating a 3 t BBOC furnace at its Omaha, Nebraska, refinery.

==== Rand Refinery ====
The South African company Rand Refinery Limited rebuilt its smelter in 1986, incorporating two 1.5 t TBRCs and a small static reverberatory furnace for cupellation to produce doré bullion containing gold and silver. The original concept was to produce doré bullion directly from the TBRCs, but this proved impossible, as it was found impossible to take the oxidation stage to completion while maintaining temperatures at which the doré would remain molten. Consequently, the reverberatory cupellation furnace was necessary to complete the process.

In January 1993, the management team of Rand Refinery decided to review alternate technologies to replace the TBRC–reverberatory furnace circuit, with the objective of having cupellation undertaken in a single stage. After evaluating the possibility of modifying the existing TBRCs by replacing the existing lance–burner combination with a separate lance and burner, and considering complete replacement of the TBRCs with an Ausmelt top-submerged lance furnace, Rand Refinery decided to replace one of the TBRC with a 4 t BBOC. The remaining TBRC is used to treat litharge slag to recover the lead for sale.

The Rand Refinery BBOC was commissioned in 1994. The operators reported a 28% reduction in the operating costs when the BBOC’s costs were compared with those of the TBRC–reverberatory furnace combination. This included a 45% reduction in bulk oxygen costs and halving the number of operators required to run the plant. The BBOC’s refractory life was 13 weeks, compared to an average refractory life of 2 weeks for the TBRCs. Other maintenance costs also fell.

==== Broken Hill Associated Smelters ====
The Broken Hill Associated Smelters Proprietary Limited (“BHAS”) lead smelter, now owned by Nyrstar NV, has been the world’s largest lead smelter. Its staff was responsible for many significant technical developments in the lead smelting industry, including the updraft sinter plant and continuous lead refining.

Until 1990, BHAS recovered silver in a two-stage reverberatory cupellation process. This process suffered from low recoveries (80–83%), a long cycle time (4–5 days) that caused large in-process inventories, inefficient use of labor and energy, and poor workplace hygiene. After a test work program undertaken at Ausmelt’s facilities in Melbourne, BHAS switched to using a process based on the Sirosmelt top-submerged lance in June 1990.

The change to the lance-based furnace increased oxygen utilization to 95% and the cycle time was reduced to a little less than eight hours, “but the grade of the doré which could be economically produced was poor.” The doré from the new furnace still contained about 0.8% lead and 0.4% copper. It was also found impractical to cast anode plates of doré directly from the Sirosmelt furnace, so the Sirosmelt doré had to undergo a further refining step in a reverberatory furnace, together with a sodium nitrate flux.

Then, in 1996, BHAS decided to modernize the refining circuit and replaced the Sirosmelt silver refining furnace with a BBOC furnace. Commissioning of the modernized refining circuit was completed in 1999, and the lead throughput was increased by 11%, with the silver refining capacity increasing to over 400 t/y.

The BBOC process proved to be “generally successful”, although it did suffer some problems with the lance jamming that were attributed to higher than expected levels of zinc in the feed, due to problems removing the zinc in earlier stages of the refinery circuit. The higher levels of zinc also caused higher than expected refractory wear and excessive lance consumption, because the heat generated by oxidizing the zinc was greater than that of oxidizing lead.

The BBOC furnace proved to be capable of producing doré containing as little as 0.01% lead and less than 0.1% copper at a temperature around 1050 °C, but BHAS wanted to cast the doré directly into anode plates using an existing doré casting conveyor. Casting using the existing conveyor proved impossible at an operating temperature of 1050 °C, because the high thermal conductivity of the silver resulted in it freezing before it reached the molds. Consequently, BHAS decided to increase the operating temperature to 1100–1150 °C so that the silver remained liquid until cast into the anode molds. A side effect of this is that the lead and copper content of the product doré are higher than if the furnace is operated at 1050 °C, at 0.2% lead and 0.6% copper. Thermodynamic calculations have shown that this is unavoidable at this higher operating temperature.

==== Other lead smelters ====
Besides the smelters named so far, the BBOC has been licensed to the operators of the Trail smelter in British Columbia, the Belledune smelter in New Brunswick, the Noyelles Godault smelter in France, the Korea Zinc zinc smelter in Onsan, South Korea, and the lead smelter at Chanderiya in India.

=== Other applications ===
In addition to its use in recovering silver in lead refineries, the BBOC has been used to treat anode slimes from copper electrolytic refineries.

Anode slimes are composed of solid particles that do not dissolve in the electrolyte in the refining cells. This includes the gold and silver present in the copper anodes that are being refined. As with recovering silver in lead smelting, reverberatory furnaces are often used in the copper refining industry for the purification and recovery of gold and silver from anode slimes. However, the reverberatory furnaces suffer from similar disadvantages in copper anode doré production as they do in lead refineries, including resulting in a large inventory of gold in the system. Other furnace types used, include top-blown rotary converters and short rotary furnaces.

==== ASARCO Amarillo copper refinery ====
The ASARCO Amarillo copper refinery switched in 1991 from reverberatory furnace treatment of anode slimes to a BBOC to reduce the gold inventory. The original reverberatory furnace had a 15 t capacity. The production cycle of the reverberatory furnace was typically 7–10 days, with the final doré production being about 8 t per cycle.

A single 3 t capacity BBOC was installed, and it was found to increase rejection of selenium from the slimes, with a reduction in fluxing requirements of about 80%.

==== Sumitomo Metal Mining Niihama refinery ====
In the 1990s, the Niihama copper refinery, owned by Sumitomo Metal Mining Company Limited (“Sumitomo”), treated copper anode slimes generated in-house, together with anode slimes from Sumitomo’s Toyo refinery and lead refinery slime from the Harima Imperial Smelting Process smelter. A total of 1200 tonnes per year (“t/y”) of anode slimes and 400 t/y of lead refinery slimes were treated using a process flow sheet that included a chloridizing step to remove separate the lead as lead chloride (PbCl_{2}) and a reverberatory-type doré furnace. It produced about 200 t of silver, 22 t of gold, 1.5 t of palladium, 300 kilograms (“kg”) of platinum and 40 kg of rhodium, as well as 60 t of selenium, 50 t of bismuth, 900 kg of tellurium and 150 t of antimony alloy annually.

The gold production doubled during the decade to 1996, as its concentration in anode slimes and the quantity of anode slimes increased. To enable this, Sumitomo decided in 1990 to upgrade the refinery, and as part of that upgrade, installed a 3.5 t-capacity BBOC to replace its reverberatory doré furnace in October 1992.

Sumitomo reported that, while the old oil-fired reverberatory furnace had served it well for many years, it had the following drawbacks:

- its operation was labor-intensive
- it had a low fuel efficiency
- there was a high waste gas volume
- the reaction rate was low.

Sumitomo investigated both the TBRC and BBOC furnaces before making a selection. It chose the BBOC over the TBRC technology because of the ease of control of the bath temperature, its high oxygen efficiency and its simple maintenance.

Sumitomo found that the impurity contents of BBOC doré anodes was high when the furnace was first commissioned. This was because it was important to determine the endpoint of the oxidation reactions to maximize the quality of the anodes. Sumitomo found that this could be determined by measuring the oxygen content of the off-gas using oxygen sensors based on stabilized zirconia with an Fe/FeO reference electrode.

Sumitomo subsequently adapted the BBOC to allow the chloridizing step to be undertaken in the furnace, thus eliminating the need for a separate chloridizing furnace for lead chloride production. This was done in February 1994 and was reported to be “giving very good results.”

==== Takehara copper refinery ====
The Takehara copper refinery of the Mitsui Mining & Smelting Company Limited of Japan commissioned a BBOC in its precious metals department in 1993.

Prior to the installation of the BBOC, the Takehara refinery refined a mixture of copper and lead anode slimes in a three reverberatory furnaces (two operating and one being rebricked) in a process that had a cycle time of 104 hours for refining 6 t of bullion.

The reverberatory furnaces were replaced with a single BBOC with a charge capacity of 6 t of feed. The cycle time was reduced to 50 hours. The use of the BBOC reduced the energy consumption from 74 GJ/t to 27 GJ/t and also had better bismuth elimination than the reverberatory furnaces.

== Advantages ==
The following advantages have been reported for the BBOC:

- very high oxygen efficiency – the injection of oxygen directly into the reaction zone within the furnace results in much greater oxygen efficiency (close to 100%) than with reverberatory furnaces (8% for the Niihama furnace) or top-blown rotary converters (about 30%)
- reduced off-gas volume – the use of industrial oxygen and the high oxygen efficiency of the process means that excess air is not required to achieve the results. This reduces the off-gas volume and thus the cost of the off-gas train and handling equipment. Rand Refinery reported that the off-gas volume of the BBOC was about 75% of that of a TBRC with a special lance conversion and only 19% of that of top-submerged lance smelting. Niihama refinery reported that its BBOC had 15% of the off-gas volume of its reverberatory furnace while producing 1.8 times the product
- higher reaction rates – by injecting the oxygen directly into the reaction zone, the reaction rates are much higher than in reverberatory furnaces where the oxygen has first to penetrate the slag layer. BRM reported a reaction rate per unit of furnace volume of 10–20 times that of the reverberatory furnace
- lower refractory wear – Rand Refinery reported that the refractory linings of its TBRC furnaces needed replacing after approximately two weeks, while the linings of its BBOC furnace lasted about 14 weeks
- lower precious metal inventories – a consequence of the higher reaction rates is that smaller furnace volumes are required and there are smaller cycle times. This results in lower precious metal inventories. In lead slimes bullion processing, the silver inventory was reduced from 4.5 t to 1.25 t after replacing a reverberatory furnace with a BBOC and at BRM the silver inventory fell from 11.5 t to 3.1 t with the introduction of the BBOC furnace
- better energy efficiency – a supplementary burner is needed only during heating the charge and doré casting operations. During cupellation, the oxidation reactions provide sufficient heat to maintain temperature. There was a 92% reduction in fuel consumption per tonne of doré treated reported for the BBOC at the Niihama refinery
- better product quality – BHAS reported that lead and copper levels in silver produced from the BBOC of 0.01% and 0.1% respectively were possible when the furnace was operating under design conditions, compared to 0.04% and 0.2% for the old reverberatory furnace, and 0.8% and 0.4% for the Sirosmelt furnace. Rand Refinery reported that a doré bullion of 99.2% was achievable. BRM reported that its doré is 99.7% silver
- higher recoveries of precious metals – due to changes in the way the BBOC is operated compare to reverberatory furnaces, notably in being able to use deeper layers of slag, there is an increase in the recovery of precious metals compared to the reverberatory furnaces. Replacement of reverberatory furnaces with BBOC furnaces saw the direct silver recovery increase from 92.5% to 97.5% at BRM and from 70% to over 95% at Niihama
- simple vessel design – the BBOC has a relatively simple vessel design, without the complex moving parts of TBRCs
- good process control – the high oxygen utilization allows good process control, particularly when combined with an oxygen sensor in the off-gas system
- lower labor requirements – the BBOC has a lower labor requirement than reverberatory furnaces, top-submerged lance furnaces and TBRCs
- lower operating costs – lower labor requirements, lower fuel requirements and longer refractory life contributed to a 28.3% reduction in overall operating costs when the BBOC was installed at the Rand Refinery
- lower capital cost – the BBOC is a simpler furnace than TBRC or top-submerged lance furnaces. Rand Refinery reported a capital cost comparison indicating that its BBOC option was 67% of the cost of a top-submerged lance option.
