= Doré bar =

Alloy of gold and silver

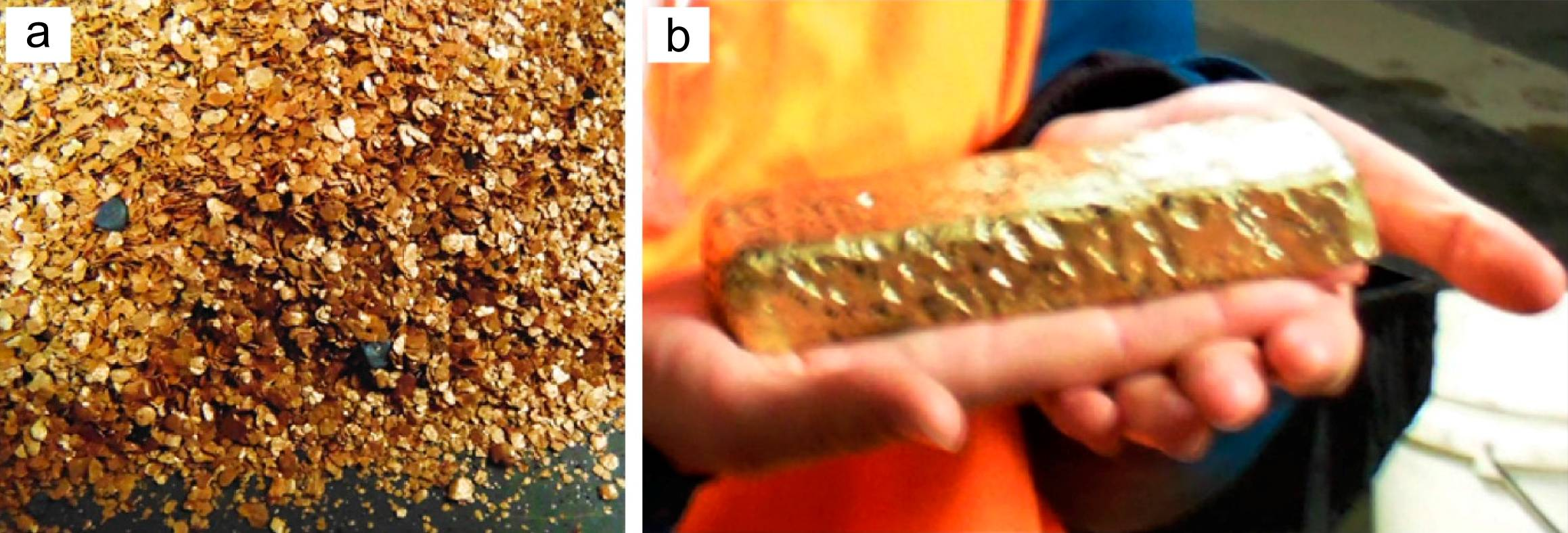
Gold concentrate, dominated by flakes ~0.5–1 mm across (a) and Doré bar produced from the gold concentrate (b).

A doré bar (/dɔːˈreɪ bɑːr/ DAW-ray-BAR, French: [dɔʁe]; "gilded" or "golden") is a semi-pure alloy of gold and silver. It is usually created at the site of a mine and then transported to a refinery for further purification.

The proportions of silver and gold can vary widely, but refineries usually require gold and silver to account for at least 70 percent of a doré bar’s weight. The most common impurities that can interfere with the refining process are iron, lead, tellurium, nickel, and copper. Before assay, precious-metal samples may be prepared by melting to make them homogeneous; in doré refining, representative samples from the homogenised melt are used to determine gold, silver and impurity content.

During the 19th century gold rushes, gold nuggets and dust were melted into crude gold bars mistakenly called "bullion" by miners. They were, more accurately, doré bars with higher contents of silver and other adulterants than the mints would accept. Mint and private assayers would subsequently refine the doré bars to an acceptable purity, 999 fine, gold bullion, with the silver and base metals removed. By the time of the California gold rush, mints were moving away from the age-old process of cupellation to "part" bullion and moving toward the acid refining process developed by chemist Joseph Louis Gay-Lussac for the French mint. By the time of the Klondike gold rush, mints were replacing Gay-Lussac's acid process and introducing electrolysis to refine doré bars into 999.9 purity gold bullion.

== Associated industry codes ==
According to the United States Census Bureau, the creation of doré bars is conducted at establishments engaged either in "Gold Ore Mining" (NAICS Code 212221), or "Primary Smelting and Refining of Nonferrous Metal (except Copper and Aluminum)" (NAICS Code 331419).

== See also ==
- Bullion
- Bullion coin
- Electrum
- Gold bar
- Gold extraction
- Gold mining
- Ore genesis
- Smelting
