= Emil Wohlwill =

German-Jewish engineer of electrochemistry

Wolf Emil Wohlwill (24 November 1835 in Seesen – 2 February 1912 in Hamburg) was a German-Jewish engineer of electrochemistry. He invented the Wohlwill process in 1874.

== Literary works ==
- Galilei und sein Kampf für die copernikanische Lehre, the 1st volume, 1909
  - the 2nd volume, 1926

== See also ==
- Wohlwill process
- Wohlwill-Andrade syndrome
