= Gold fingerprinting =

Method of identifying an item made of gold

Gold fingerprinting is a method used to identify and authenticate gold items by analyzing the unique composition of impurities or trace elements within the metal. While gold itself is an inert and relatively uniform element, gold found in natural or processed items often contains small amounts of other elements, such as silver or lead. These trace elements, which vary depending on the source and refining process, serve as a "fingerprint" for the gold. By comparing the elemental composition of a gold sample to databases of known sources, experts can determine where the gold was likely mined or processed. This technique is applied in fields such as archaeology, geology, and forensic science, as it provides insights into the provenance of historical artifacts, mined gold, or stolen items.

== Applications ==
Gold fingerprinting characterizes a gold sample or gold-containing item by analyzing its trace elements, identifying the sample by its mineralizing event and linking it to a specific mine or bullion source. Elements that are measured above detection limits can be used for gold fingerprinting and geochemical characterization. For this technique to be effective in identifying the origins of gold, a database of fingerprinted samples from mines and bullion sources is required.

This technique has been used to assert claims over stolen or relocated gold, even in instances where it has been salted—deliberately blended with gold from disparate origins. Beyond this, gold fingerprinting serves as a tool in identifying the often obscure provenance of gold artifacts.

== Method ==
Electron probe microanalysis (EMPA), Synchrotron micro-XRF (SR-M-XRF), Time-of-flight secondary ion mass spectrometry (TOF-SIMS), Laser induced breakdown spectroscopy (LIBS), Atomic emission spectrometry, x-ray fluorescence spectrometry with higher energy synchrotron radiation (SR-XFS) and Laser ablation-Inductively coupled plasma mass spectrometry (LA-ICP-MS) are all methods of gold fingerprinting.

The most common method is LA-ICP-MS primarily because it is quasi-nondestructive, allowing for the preservation of the samples and convenient as samples require little to no preparation. Laser ablation allows for high spatial resolution sampling while the inductively coupled plasma mass spectrometry provides high sensitivity to identify extremely small amounts of trace elements within the gold. This method can also be conducted outside of a lab with the assistance of a portable device that uses a diode pumped solid state laser and fiber-optics, making fingerprinting more convenient as it eliminates the need for transfer of gold to a specific lab.

Advantages of LA-ICP-MS include reduced sample preparation, no sample size requirements, reduced spectral interference and increased sample throughput. Over the past 32 years, LA-ICP-MS has been used for archaeological, biological and forensic purposes. For example a group of gold foil fragments dating back to the 5th Century B.C.E. were analysized by LA-ICP-MS uncovering information on their manufacturing process, function and relationship to one another.

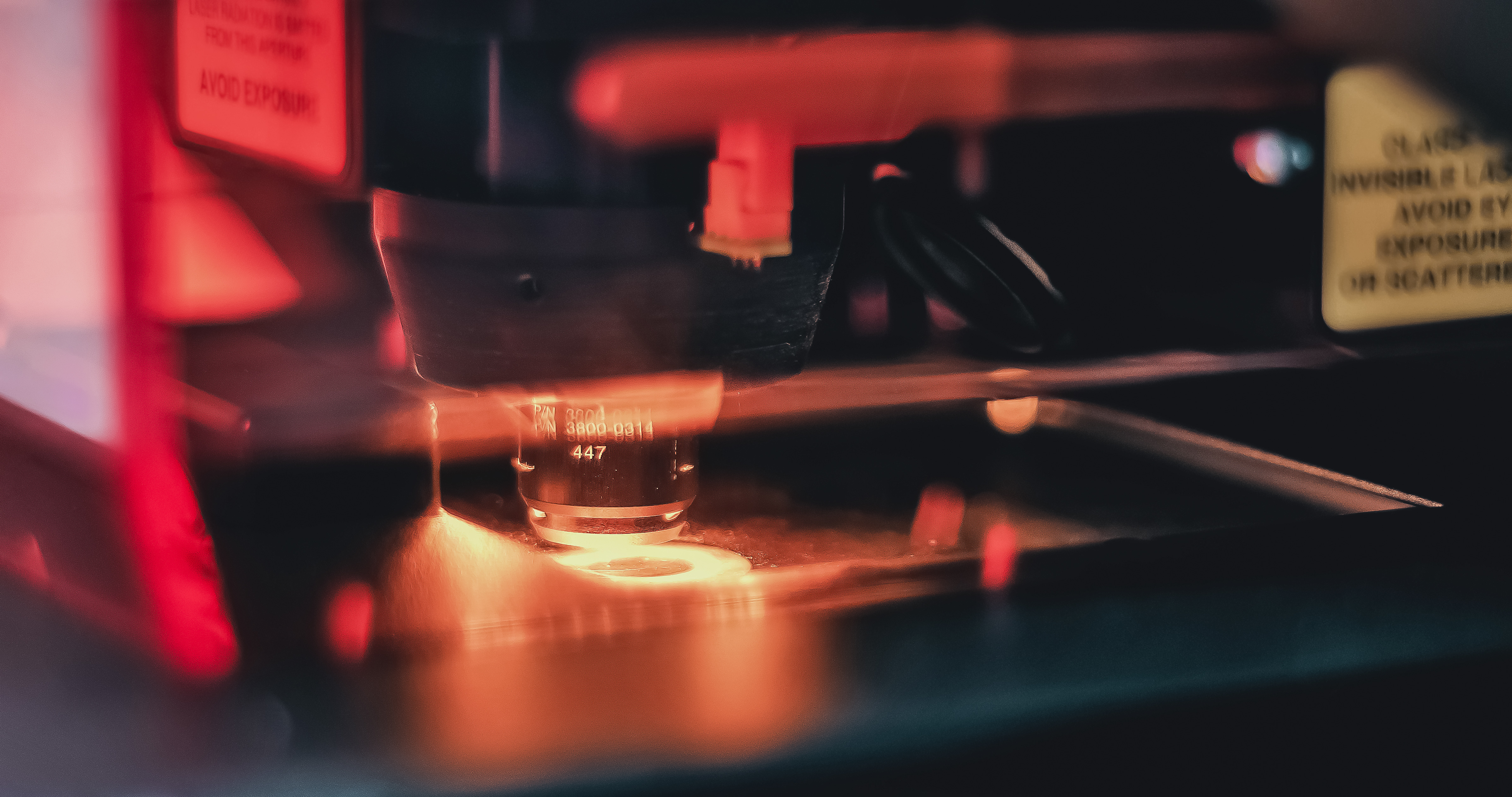
High precision laser ablation

== Complications ==
LA-ICP-MS function optimally with gold particles greater than 60 μm in diameter to avoid any contamination during measurements. Although LA-ICP-MS has a lower detection limit, its overall precision was lower than other analysis techniques for trace element concentrations such as field emission-electron probe microanalysis (FE-EPMA) and synchrotron micro X-ray fluorescence spectroscopy (SR-l-XRF).

Due to the small size of gold (<5μm-250μm) small fragments of minerals need to be separated from the gold before analysis can occur.

Gold fingerprinting has limitations including elemental fractionation (the non-sample related analyte) and calibration requires matrix-matched standards.

A few other problems exist that limit actual sourcing or provencancing of gold in relation to manufactured art objects. These problems include: a lack of an extensive database of elemental profiles in gold ores, the natural differences that coexist in ore geology and the difficulties of accurately analyzing trace elements. Also, trading, looting and re-melting of so called “precious” metal objects add to the problem of sourcing.

== See also ==
- Gold laundering
