= Gold extraction =

Process of extracting gold from ore

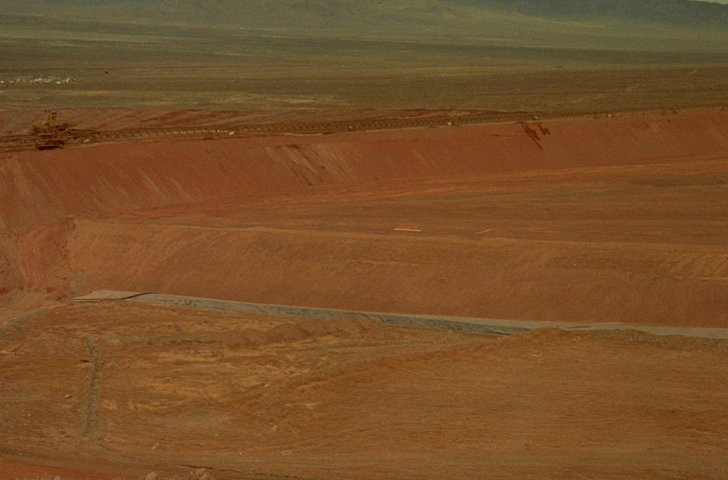
Cyanide leaching "heap" at a gold mining operation near Elko, Nevada. On top of the large mounds of ore, are sprinklers dispensing a solution of cyanide.

Gold extraction is the extraction of gold from dilute ores using a combination of chemical processes. Gold mining produces about 3,600 tons annually, and another 300 tons is produced from recycling. Since the 20th century, gold has been principally extracted in a cyanide process by leaching the ore with cyanide solution. The gold may then be further refined by gold parting, which removes other metals (principally silver) by blowing chlorine gas through the molten metal. Historically, small particles of gold were amalgamated with mercury, and then concentrated by boiling away the mercury. The mercury method is still used in some small operations.

== Types of ore ==
Gold occurs principally as a native metal, i.e., gold itself. Sometimes it is alloyed to a greater or lesser extent with silver, which is called electrum. Native gold can occur as sizeable nuggets, as fine grains or flakes in alluvial deposits, or as grains or microscopic particles (known as colour) embedded in rock minerals. Other forms of gold are the minerals calaverite (AuTe), aurostibnite (AuSb_{2}), and maldonite (Au_{2}Bi). These latter three, although rarer than native gold, can be slow to react with cyanide and thus difficult to process. Still other gold-containing ores include various tellurides (sylvanite, nagyagite, petzite, and krennerite).

Certain contaminants in ores can interfere with the extractability of gold by cyanide. These interfering agents are called "preg-robbing ores". For example, gold can bind tightly to carbon, resisting normal cyanide extraction. Gold cyanides bind also to some clays.

== Concentration ==
Chemical structure of potassium dicyanoaurate.

While the romantic picture of gold mining focuses on nuggets, the reality is that gold is typically recovered from ores containing >10 ppm of the metal. Thus, the main challenge is concentrating this trace amount.

=== Cyanidation (and thiosulfate) ===
The principal technology is the cyanide process, in which gold is leached from the ore by treatment with a solution of cyanide. The first step is comminution (grinding) to increase surface area and expose the gold to the extracting solution. The extraction is conducted by dump leaching or heap leaching processes. Sodium cyanide is produced on a billion-ton/year scale mainly for this purpose. "Black cyanide", a carbon-contaminated form of calcium cyanide (Ca(CN)_{2}) is often used because it is cheap. The crude ore is washed with a c. 0.3% solution of cyanide in air, often repeatedly, and the aqueous extract is collected and refined further. Recovery from solution typically involves adsorption on activated carbon, the carbon in pulp process.

Thiosulfate leaching has been proven to be effective on ores with high soluble copper values or ores which experience preg-robbing. Leaching through bulk leach extractable gold, or BLEG, is also a process that is used to test an area for gold concentrations where gold may not be immediately visible.

=== Mercury amalgamation ===
Amalgamation with mercury can be used to recover fine gold particles, and mercury continues to be used in artisanal and small-scale gold mining worldwide. Mercury forms a mercury-gold amalgam with smaller gold particles, and then the gold is concentrated by heating the amalgam to evaporate the mercury. This is effective in extracting very small gold particles, but the process is hazardous due to the toxicity of mercury vapour. Large-scale use of mercury stopped in the 1960s. However, mercury is still used in artisanal and small-scale gold mining (ASGM). One mechanism by which mercury is employed in hydraulic mining is as an "undercurrent", in which the flow of smaller grains is diverted over mercury-coated copper plates. High flow velocities associated with hydraulic mining cause flouring of mercury, the wearing down of mercury particles that contributes to mercury loss into the environment.

Over 10,000,000 pounds (4,500,000 kg) of mercury contaminated the environment in California as a result of placer mining in the late nineteenth and early twentieth centuries. Stamp mill mining contributed an additional 3,000,000 pounds (1,400,000 kg) of mercury contamination. Mercury contamination in California waterways is a major contemporary environmental issue, as is groundwater pollution, mostly by inorganic mercury.

=== Refractory gold processes ===
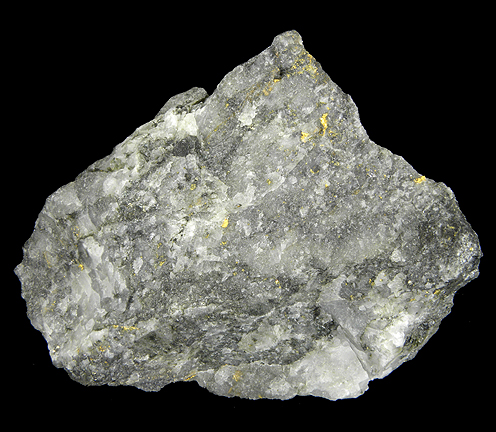
High-grade gold ore from a quartz vein near Alma, Colorado. The appearance is typical of very good gold-quartz ore.

A "refractory" gold ore is an ore that has ultra-fine gold particles disseminated throughout its gold occluded minerals. These ores are naturally resistant to recovery by standard cyanidation and carbon adsorption processes. These refractory ores require pre-treatment before cyanidation can be used. A refractory ore generally contains sulphide minerals, organic carbon, or both. Sulphide minerals are impermeable minerals that occlude gold particles, making it difficult for the leach solution to form a complex with the gold. Organic carbon present in gold ore may adsorb dissolved gold-cyanide complexes in much the same way as activated carbon. This so-called "preg-robbing" carbon is washed away because it is significantly finer than the carbon recovery screens typically used to recover activated carbon.

Pre-treatment options for refractory ores include:

1. Roasting
2. Bio-oxidation, such as bacterial oxidation
3. Pressure oxidation
4. Albion process

The refractory ore treatment processes may be preceded by concentration (usually sulphide flotation). Roasting is used to oxidize both the sulphur and organic carbon at high temperatures using air and/or oxygen. Bio-oxidation involves the use of bacteria that promote oxidation reactions in an aqueous environment. Pressure oxidation is an aqueous process for sulphur removal carried out in a continuous autoclave, operating at high pressures and somewhat elevated temperatures. The Albion process utilises a combination of ultrafine grinding and atmospheric, auto-thermal, oxidative leaching.

== Gold refining and parting ==
Parting is a process by which gold is purified to a commercially-tradeable standard, typically ≥99.5%. Removal of silver is of particular interest since the two metals often co-purify. The standard procedure is based on the Miller process. The separation is achieved by passing chlorine gas into a molten alloy. The technique is practiced on a large scale (e.g. 500 kg). The principle of the method exploits the nobility of gold, such that at high temperatures, gold does not react with chlorine, but virtually all contaminating metals do. Thus, at c. 500 °C, as the chlorine gas is passed through molten mixture (again, mainly gold), a low-density slag forms on top, which can be decanted from the liquid gold. Silver chloride and other precious metals can be recovered from this slag. The slag layer is often diluted with a flux like borax to facilitate the separation.

Alternative methods exist for parting gold. Silver can be dissolved selectively by boiling the mixture with 30% nitric acid, a process sometimes called inquartation. Affination is a largely obsolete process of removing silver from gold using concentrated sulfuric acid. Electrolysis using the Wohlwill process is yet another approach.

== History ==
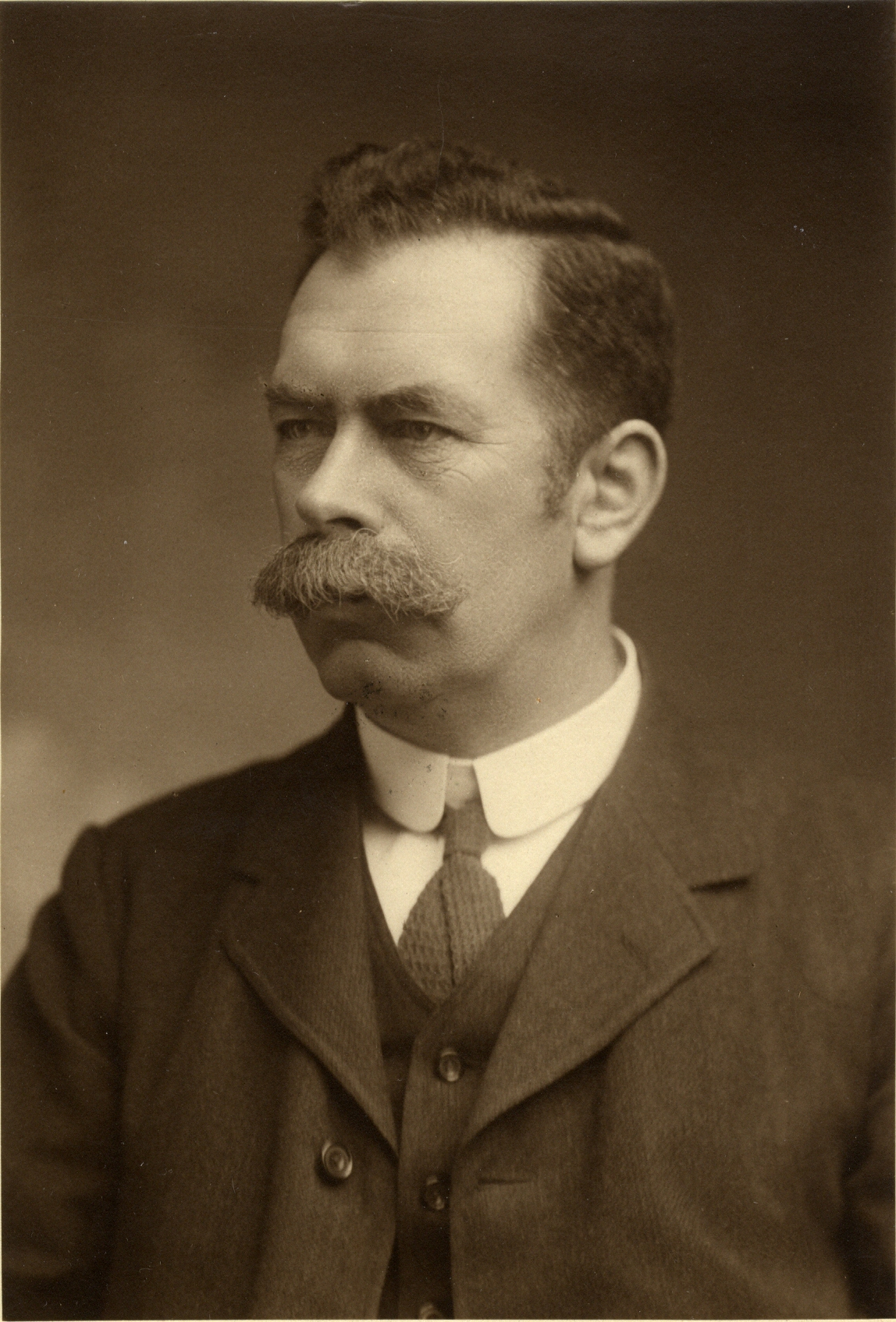
John Stewart MacArthur developed the cyanide process for gold extraction in 1887.

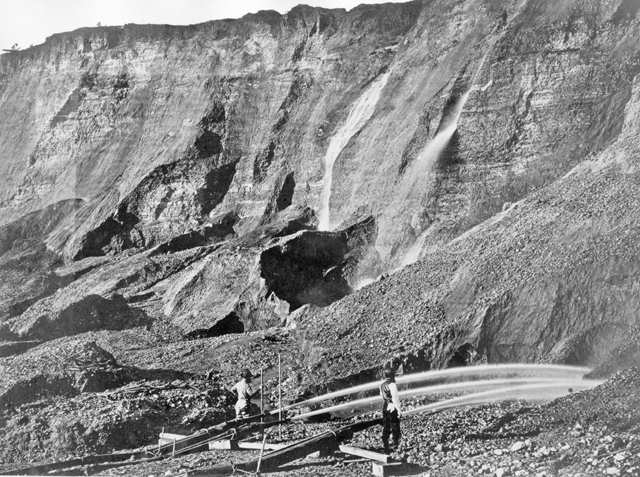
Gold miners excavate an eroded bluff with jets of water at a placer mine in Dutch Flat, California sometime between 1857 and 1870.

The smelting of gold began sometime around 6000 – 3000 BC. According to one source the technique began to be in use in Mesopotamia or Syria. In ancient Greece, Heraclitus wrote on the subject. According to de Lecerda and Salomons (1997) mercury was first in use for extraction at about 1000 BC, according to Meech and others (1998), mercury was used in obtaining gold until the latter period of the first millennia. A technique known to Pliny the Elder was extraction by way of crushing, washing, and then applying heat, with the resultant material powdered.

=== Industrial era ===
Like all metals, gold is insoluble in water. Gold does however exhibit the distinctive properties that in the presence of cyanide ions, it dissolves in the presence of oxygen (or air). This transformation was reported in 1783 by Carl Wilhelm Scheele, but it was not until the late 19th century, that the reactions were exploited commercially. The expansion of gold mining in the Rand of South Africa began to slow down in the 1880s, as the new deposits being found tended to be pyritic ore. The gold was difficult to extract from such ores.

A process known as chlorination was once used to treat pyritic gold ore. Typically, the ore was roasted and then treated with chlorine gas. The residue was extracted to give an aqueous solution of gold chloride. It was used, notably at the Mount Morgan mine, where it remained in use until 1911. The chloride process became obsolete with the development of the cyanide process.

In 1887, John Stewart MacArthur, working in collaboration with brothers Dr Robert and Dr William Forrest for the Tennant Company in Glasgow, Scotland, developed the MacArthur-Forrest Process for the extraction of gold ores. By suspending the crushed ore in a cyanide solution, up to 96 percent gold was extracted.

The process was first used on a large scale at the Witwatersrand in 1890, leading to a boom of investment as larger gold mines were opened up. In 1896, Bodländer confirmed that oxygen was necessary for the process, something that had been doubted by MacArthur, and discovered that hydrogen peroxide was formed as an intermediate.

The method known as heap leaching was first proposed in 1969 by the United States Bureau of Mines, and was in use by the 1970s.

== See also ==
- Digger gold
- Ore genesis
- Chrysopoeia, transmutation into gold
