= Cupellation =

Refining process in metallurgy

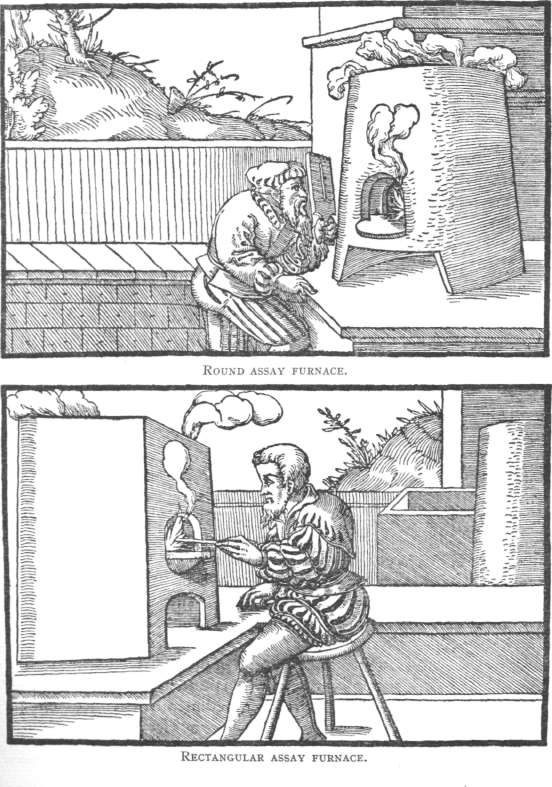
16th century cupellation furnaces (per Agricola)

Cupellation is a refining process in metallurgy in which ores or alloyed metals are heated to very high temperatures and subjected to controlled operations to separate noble metals like gold and silver, from base metals like lead, copper, zinc, arsenic, antimony, or bismuth, in the ore. Cupellation is based on the principle that precious metals typically oxidise or react chemically at much higher temperatures than base metals. At high temperatures the precious metals remain separate but the others react, forming slags or other compounds.

Since the Early Bronze Age, the process was used to obtain silver from smelted lead ores. By the Middle Ages and the Renaissance, cupellation was one of the most common processes for refining precious metals. By then, fire assays were used for assaying minerals: testing fresh metals such as lead and recycled metals to determine their purity for jewellery and coin making. Cupellation remains in use.

== Process ==
=== Large-scale cupellation ===
Native silver is a rare element. Although it exists as such, it is usually found in nature combined with other metals, or in minerals that contain silver compounds, generally in the form of sulfides such as galena (lead sulfide) or cerussite (lead carbonate). So the primary production of silver requires the smelting and then cupellation of argentiferous lead ores.

Lead melts at 327 °C, lead oxide at 888 °C, and silver melts at 960 °C. To separate the silver, the alloy is melted again at the high temperature of 960 °C to 1000 °C in an oxidizing environment. The lead oxidises to lead monoxide, then known as litharge, which captures the oxygen from the other metals present. The liquid lead oxide is removed or absorbed by capillary action into the hearth linings. This chemical reaction may be viewed as

Ag(s) + 2 Pb(s) + O_{2}(g) → 2 PbO(absorbed) + Ag(l)

The base of the hearth was dug in the form of a saucepan and covered with an inert and porous material rich in calcium or magnesium such as shells, lime, or bone ash. The lining had to be calcareous because lead reacts with silica (clay compounds) to form viscous lead silicate that prevents the needed absorption of litharge, whereas calcareous materials do not react with lead. Some of the litharge evaporates, and the rest is absorbed by the porous earth lining to form "litharge cakes".

Litharge cakes are usually circular or concavo-convex, about 15 cm in diameter. They are the most common archaeological evidence of cupellation in the Early Bronze Age. By analyzing their chemical composition, archaeologists can discern what kind of ore was treated, its main components, and the chemical conditions used in the process. This permits insights about production process, trade, social needs or economic situations.

=== Small-scale cupellation ===
Small-scale cupellation is based on the same principle as the one done in a cupellation hearth; the main difference lies in the amount of material to be tested or obtained. The minerals have to be crushed, roasted and smelted to concentrate the metallic components to separate the noble metals. By the Renaissance the use of the cupellation processes was diverse: assay of ores from the mines, testing the amount of silver in jewels or coins or for experimental purposes. It was carried out in small shallow recipients known as cupels.

As the main purpose of small-scale cupellation was to assay and test minerals and metals, the matter to be tested must be carefully weighed. The assays were made in the cupellation or assay furnace, which needs to have windows and bellows to ascertain that the air oxidises the lead, as well as to be sure and prepared to take away the cupel when the process is complete. Pure lead must be added to the matter being tested to guarantee the further separation of the impurities. After the litharge has been absorbed by the cupel, buttons of silver were formed and settled in the middle of the cupel. If the alloy also contained a certain amount of gold, it settled with the silver, and both had to be separated by parting.

==== Cupels ====
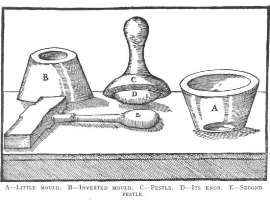
Brass moulds for making cupels

The primary tool for small-scale cupellation was the cupel. Cupels were manufactured in a careful manner. They used to be small vessels shaped in the form of an inverted truncated cone, made of bone ashes. According to Georg Agricola, the best material was obtained from burned antlers of deer, although fish spines could also work. Ashes have to be ground into a fine and homogeneous powder and mixed with some sticky substance to mould the cupels. Moulds were made out of copper with no bottoms, so that the cupels could be taken off. A shallow depression in the centre of the cupel was made with a rounded pestle. Cupel sizes depend on the amount of material to be assayed. This same shape has been maintained until the present.

Archaeological investigations as well as archaeometallurgical analysis and written texts from the Renaissance have demonstrated the existence of different materials for their manufacture; they could be made also with mixtures of bones and wood ashes, of poor quality, or moulded with a mixture of this kind in the bottom with an upper layer of bone ashes. Different recipes depend on the expertise of the assayer or on the special purpose for which it was made (assays for minting, jewelry, testing purity of recycled material or coins). Archaeological evidence shows that at the beginnings of small-scale cupellation, potsherds or clay cupels were used.

== History ==
The first known use of silver was in the Near East in Anatolia and Mesopotamia during the 4th and 3rd millennium BC, the Early Bronze Age. Archaeological findings of silver and lead objects together with litharge pieces and slag have been studied in a variety of sites. Although this has been interpreted as silver being extracted from lead ores, it has been also suggested that lead was added to collect silver from visible silver minerals embedded in host rock. In both cases silver would be retrieved from lead metal by cupellation.

During the following Iron Age, cupellation was done by fusing the base metals with a surplus of lead. The bullion or product of this fusion was then heated in a cupellation furnace to separate the noble metals. Mines such as Rio Tinto, near Huelva in Spain, became an important political and economic site around the Mediterranean Sea, as well as Laurion in Greece. In 483 BC, increased output from the mines of Laurion helped finance the expansion of the Athenian fleet to 200 triremes by 480 BC.

During Roman times, the empire needed large quantities of lead to support the Roman civilization over a great territory; they searched for open lead-silver mines in areas they conquered. Silver coinage became the normalised medium of exchange, hence silver production and mine control gave economic and political power. In Roman times it was worth mining lead ores if their content of silver was 0.01% or more.

The origin of the use of cupellation for analysis is not known. One of the earliest written references to cupels is Theophilus Divers Ars in the 12th century AD. The process changed little until the 16th century.

Small-scale cupellation may be considered the most important fire assay developed in history, and perhaps the origin of chemical analysis. Most of the written evidence comes from the Renaissance in the 16th century. Vannoccio Biringuccio, Georg Agricola and Lazarus Ercker, among others, wrote about the art of mining and testing the ores, as well as detailed descriptions of cupellation. Their descriptions and assumptions have been identified in diverse archaeological findings through Medieval and Renaissance Europe. By these times the amount of fire assays increased considerably, mainly because of testing ores in the mines to identify the availability of its exploitation. A primary use of cupellation was related to minting activities, and it was also used in testing jewelry. Since the Renaissance, cupellation became a standardised method of analysis that has changed little, demonstrating its efficiency. Its development touched the spheres of economy, politics, warfare and power in ancient times.

== New World ==
The huge amount of Pre-Hispanic silver adornments known especially from Peru, Bolivia and Ecuador raises the question whether the pre-Hispanic civilizations obtained the raw material from native ores or from argentiferous-lead ores. Although native silver may be available in America, it is as rare as in the Old World. From colonial texts it is known that silver mines were open in colonial times by the Spaniards from Mexico to Argentina, the main ones being those of Tasco, Mexico, and Potosí in Bolivia.

Some kind of blast furnaces called huayrachinas were described in colonial texts, as native technology furnaces used in Peru and Bolivia to smelt the ores that come from the silver mines owned by the Spaniards. Although it is not conclusive, it is believed that these kinds of furnaces were used before the Spanish Conquest. Ethnoarchaeological and archaeological work in Porco Municipality, Potosí, Bolivia, has suggested pre-European use of huayrachinas.

There are no specific archaeological accounts about silver smelting or mining in the Andes prior to the Incas. Silver and lead artefacts have been found in the Peruvian central highlands dated in the pre-Inca and Inca periods. From the presence of lead in silver artefacts, archaeologists suggest that cupellation occurred there.

== See also ==
- Alchemy
- Archaeometry
- Bottom-blown oxygen converter
- History of alchemy
- History of chemistry
- Philosopher's stone

== Bibliography ==
- Bayley, J. 1995. Precious Metal Refining, in Historical Metallurgy Society Datasheets: https://web.archive.org/web/20160418021923/http://hist-met.org/hmsdatasheet02.pdf (accessed January 13, 2010)
- Bayley, J. 2008 Medieval precious metal refining: archaeology and contemporary texts compared, in Martinón-Torres, M and Rehren, Th (eds) Archaeology, history and science: integrating approaches to ancient materials by. Left Coast Press: 131-150.
- Bayley, J., Eckstein, K. 2006. Roman and medieval litharge cakes: structure and composition, in J. Pérez-Arantegui (ed) Proc. 34th Int. Symposium on Archaeometry. Institución Fernando el Católito, CSIC, Zaragoza: 145-153. (PDF)
- Bayley, J., Rehren, Th. 2007. Towards a functional and Typological classification of crucibles, in La Niece, S and Craddock, P (eds) Metals and Mines. Studies in Archaeometallurgy. Archetype Books: 46-55
- Bayley, J., Crossley, D. and Ponting, M. (eds). 2008. Metals and Metalworking. A research framework for archaeometallurgy. Historical Metallurgy Society 6.
- Craddock, P. T. 1991. Mining and smelting in Antiquity, in Bowman, S. (ed), Science and the Past, London: British Museum Press: 57-73..
- Craddock, P. T. 1995. Early metal mining and production. Edinburgh: Edinburgh University Press.
- Hoover, H. and Hoover, H. 1950 [1556]. Georgius Agricola De Re Metallica. New York: Dover.
- Howe, E., Petersen, U. 1994. Silver and Lead in late Prehistory of the Montaro Valley, Peru. In Scott, D., and Meyers P. (eds.) Archaeometry of Pre-Columbian Sites and Artifacts: 183-197. The Getty Conservation Institute.
- Laurion and Thorikos (accessed January 15, 2010)
- Jones, G.D. 1980. The Roman Mines at Riotinto, in The Journal of Roman Studies 70: 146-165. Society for the promotion of Roman Studies.
- Jones, D. (ed) 2001. Archaeometallurgy. Centre for Archaeological Guidelines. English Heritage publications. London.
- Karsten, H., Hauptmann, H., Wright, H., Whallon, R. 1998. Evidence of fourth millennium BC silver production at Fatmali-Kalecik, East Anatolia. in Metallurgica Antiqua: in honour of Hans-Gert Bachmann and Robert Maddin by Bachmann, H. G, Maddin, Robert, Rehren, Thilo, Hauptmann, Andreas, Muhly, James David, Deutsches Bergbau-Museum: 57-67
- Kassianidou, V. 2003. Early Extraction of Silver from Complex Polymetallic Ores, in Craddock, P.T. and Lang, J (eds) Mining and Metal production through the Ages. London, British Museum Press: 198-206
- Lechtman, H. 1976. A metallurgical site survey in the Peruvian Andes, in Journal of field Archaeology 3 (1): 1-42.
- Martinón-Torres, M., Rehren, Th. 2005a. Ceramic materials in fire assay practices: a case study of 16th-century laboratory equipment, in M. I. Prudencio, M. I. Dias and J. C. Waerenborgh (eds), Understanding people through their pottery, 139-149 (Trabalhos de Arqueologia 42). Lisbon: Instituto Portugues de Arqueologia.
- Martinón-Torres, M., Rehren, Th. 2005b. Alchemy, chemistry and metallurgy in Renaissance Europe. A wider context for fire assay remains, in Historical Metallurgy: journal of the Historical Metallurgy Society, 39(1): 14-31.
- Martinón-Torres, M., Rehren, Th., Thomas, N., Mongiatti, A. 2009. Identifying materials, recipes and choices: Some suggestions for the study of Archaeological cupels. In Giumla-Mair, A. et al., Archaeometallurgy in Europe: 1-11 Milan: AIM
- Pernicka, E., Rehren, Th., Schmitt-Strecker, S. 1998. Late Uruk silver production by cupellation at Habuba Kabira, Syria in Metallurgica Antiqua : in honour of Hans-Gert Bachmann and Robert Maddin by Bachmann, H. G, Maddin, Robert, Rehren, Thilo, Hauptmann, Andreas, Muhly, James David, Deutsches Bergbau-Museum: 123-134.
- Rehren, Th.1996. Alchemy and Fire Assay – An Analytical Approach, in Historical Metallurgy 30: 136-142.
- Rehren, Th. 2003. Crucibles as reaction vessels in ancient metallurgy, in P.T. Craddock and J. Lang (eds), Mining and Metal Production through the Ages, 207-215. London. The British Museum Press.
- Rehren, Th., Eckstein, K 2002. The development of analytical cupellation in the Middle Ages, in E Jerem and K T Biró (eds) Archaeometry 98. Proceedings of the 31 st Symposium, Budapest, April 26 – May 3, 1998 (Oxford BAR International Series 1043 – Central European Series 1), 2: 445-448.
- Rehren, Th., Schneider, J., Bartels, Chr. 1999. Medieval lead-silver smelting in the Siegerland, West Germany. In Historical Metallurgy: journal of the Historical Metallurgy Society. 33: 73-84. Sheffield: Historical Metallurgy Society.
- Tylecote, R.F. 1992. A History of Metallurgy. Second Edition Maney for the Institute of Materials. London.
- Van Buren, M., Mills, B. 2005. Huayrachinas and Tocochimbos: Traditional Smelting Technology of the Southern Andes, in Latin American Antiquity 16(1):3-25
- Wood J. R., Hsu, Y-T and Bell, C. 2021 Sending Laurion Back to the Future: Bronze Age Silver and the Source of Confusion, Internet Archaeology 56. https://doi.org/10.11141/ia.56.9
