= Wohlwill process =

Industrial procedure used to refine gold

The Wohlwill process is an industrial-scale chemical procedure used to refine gold to the highest degree of purity (99.999%). The process was invented in 1874 by Emil Wohlwill. This electrochemical process involves using a cast gold ingot, often called a doré bar, of 95%+ gold to serve as an anode. Lower percentages of gold in the anode will interfere with the reaction, especially when the contaminating metal is silver or one of the platinum group elements. The cathodes for this reaction are small sheets of pure (24k) gold sheeting or stainless steel. Current is applied to the system, and electricity travels through the electrolyte of chloroauric acid. Gold and other metals are dissolved at the anode, and pure gold (coming through the chloroauric acid by ion transfer) is preferably plated onto the gold cathode while other metals remain in the solution. When the anode is dissolved, the cathode is removed and melted or otherwise processed in the manner required for sale or use. The resulting gold is 99.999% pure, and of higher purity than gold produced by the other common refining method, the Miller process, which produces gold of 99.5% purity.

For industrial gold production the Wohlwill process is necessary for highest purity gold applications. When lower purity gold is required, refiners often utilize the Miller process for its relative ease and quicker turnaround times and because it does not require a large inventory of gold, in the form of chloroauric acid.

== See also ==
- Gold parting
