= Miller process =

Industrial procedure used to refine gold

The Miller process is an industrial-scale chemical procedure used to refine gold to a high degree of purity (99.5%). It was patented by Francis Bowyer Miller in 1867. This chemical process involves blowing chlorine gas through molten, but (slightly) impure, gold. Nearly all metal contaminants react to form chlorides but gold does not at these high temperatures. The other metals volatilize or form a low density slag on top of the molten gold.

When all impurities have been removed from the gold (observable by a change in flame color) the gold is removed and processed in the manner required for sale or use. The resulting gold is 99.5% pure, but of lower purity than gold produced by the other common refining method, the Wohlwill process, which produces gold of up to 99.999% purity.

The Wohlwill process is commonly used for producing high-purity gold, such as in electronics work, where exacting standards of purity are required. When highest purity gold is not required, refiners use the Miller process due to its relative ease, quicker turnaround times, and because it does not tie up the large amount of gold in the form of chloroauric acid which the Wohlwill process permanently requires for the electrolyte.

== See also ==
- Gold parting
