= Gold parting =

Process of separating gold from silver

Gold parting is the separating of gold from silver (and other metallic impurities). Gold and silver are often extracted from the same ores and are chemically similar. Their separation therefore is the usual focus of parting the alloy of gold and silver, called electrum.

== Contemporary technology ==
Four technologies are dominant. The first two start with relatively pure gold, while the third start with alloys even when there is high silver content.

- The Miller process affords gold up to 99.5% purity. The process involves blowing a stream of chlorine through molten gold. Impurities in the gold form chlorides, which form a slag that floats on the molten gold.
- Invented by Emil Wohlwill in 1874, the Wohlwill process produces the highest purity gold (99.999%). It is an electrolytic process using pure gold for the cathode (or titanium as a starter cathode) and chloroauric acid (gold chloride-hydrochloric acid) as the electrolyte; this is made by dissolving gold with chlorine gas in the presence of hydrochloric acid. Gold is dissolved at the anode, and pure gold, traveling through the acid by ion transfer, is plated onto the cathode. Silver forms an insoluble chloride slime and copper and platinum form soluble chlorides that are removed. This procedure is used on a very large industrial scale and has a large set up cost due to the amount of gold that needs to be permanently dissolved in the electrolyte.
- The Aqua Regia process has been used since ancient times. It works by dissolving the sample in Aqua Regia. Silver precipitates as chloride while other impurities stay in solution. After filtration a reducing agent is added which selectively precipitates gold as metal, with 99.99% purity achievable. It is fast, cost-effective and preferable for small operations.
- The Acidless Separation (ALS), developed in 2014, has been designed to pre-refine doré and jewelry alloys even when there is high silver content, which is normally a problem for existing chemical pre-refinement processes. The metals are separated by vacuum distillation. It is currently adopted by the most important international refineries.

=== Other ===
Alternative methods exist for parting gold. Silver can be dissolved selectively by boiling the mixture with 30% nitric acid. Affination is a largely obsolete process of removing silver from gold using concentrated sulfuric acid.

Cupellation removes gold and silver from mixtures containing lead and other metals, but silver cannot be separated from gold by this process alone.

== History ==
Gold parting as a process was invented specifically to remove silver. The advent of coinage required methods to remove impurities from the gold. Over the centuries special means of separation have been invented.

The main ancient process of gold parting was by salt cementation, of which there is archaeological evidence from the 6th century BC in Sardis, Lydia. In the post-medieval period parting using antimony, sulfates and mineral acids was also used.

=== Early history ===
The very earliest attempts at refining gold can be shown by the surface enhancement of gold rings. Gold quality was increased at the surface by 80–95% gold compared to 64–75% gold at the interior found in Nahal Qanah Cave dated to the 4th millennium BC. Further evidence is from three gold chisels from the 3rd Millennium BC royal cemetery at Ur that had a surface of high gold (83%), low silver (9%) and copper (8%) compared with an interior of 45% gold, 10% silver and 45% copper. The surface was compacted and heavily burnished and indicates early use of depletion gilding.

=== Ancient and medieval world ===
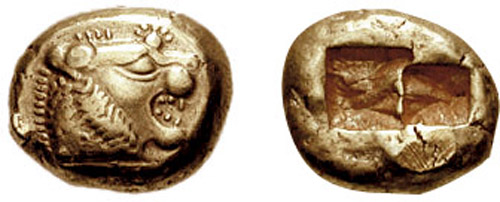
Early 6th century BC Lydian gold coinage

Separation of gold from silver was not practised in antiquity prior to the Lydian Period (12th century BC to 546 BC). Material from Sardis (in modern Turkey) is evidence of the earliest use of gold and silver parting in the 6th century. Literary sources and the lack of physical evidence suggest that gold-silver parting was not practised before the mid first millennium BC. Gold parting came with the invention of coinage and there is no evidence for the use of a true refining processes before the introduction of coinage. As refining gold (as opposed to surface enhancement) results in a noticeable loss in material, there would have been little reason to do this before the advent of coinage and the need to have a standard grade of material.

The first possible literary reference to the salt cementation parting process is in the Arthashastra, a 4th-century BC treatise from India, that mentions heating of gold with Indus earth. Indus earth is taken to mean soils high in salt, nitre and ammonium salts and therefore ideal for the cementation parting process. A better known and more detailed early description is given by Diodorus Siculus in the 1st century BC quoting an earlier lost book, On the Erythraean Sea from the 2nd century BC by Agatharchides of Cnidus. An experiment recreating the process as described by Diodorus Siculus by heating a mixture of the gold and salt in a sealed pot for 5 days was done by Notton and was found to be successful.

Pliny in his Naturalis Historia mentions the purification of gold a number of times and makes reference to the salt cementation process of gold parting. He says that the gold is "roasted with a double weight of salt and three times the weight of misy (ferric sulfates) and again with two portions of salt and one of the stone which is called schiston." Here he is describing the heating of gold with salt and iron sulfates which act to dissolve the copper and silver in the gold. Parting vessels used for refining gold with the cementation process have been found in London, Lincoln, York and Winchester. The London vessels, dating from the Flavian period (c. 70–85 AD), were sealed using luting clay; XRF analysis detected gold and silver, with highest concentration around the sealed region showing possible escape of silver as the volatile silver chloride.

Gold parting had been well used throughout the ancient times but only in the Medieval period were clear and detailed descriptions of the processes written. All the archaeological finds of Roman and early medieval parting point to a solid state process using common salt as the active ingredient. The only large group of medieval parting vessels so far discovered were found at Coppergate and Piccadilly sites in York. The pinkish-purple discolouration of the vessels showed them to have been used with the salt cementation process which removes iron from the clay as ferric chloride. Other vessel fragments are known from Carlisle and Winchester. Theophilus was a 12th-century German monk and in his book De Diversus Artibus gives the clearest description of the salt cementation process.

break into tiny pieces a tile or piece of burnt and reddened furnace-clay and when it is powdered, divide it into two equal parts by weight and add to it a third part of salt of the same weight. It should then be lightly sprinkled with urine and mixed so that it does not stick together but is just moistened.

— Theophilus,

This mixture is then added to an earthenware pot and layered with thin sheets of gold foil. The pot is then sealed and heated in a furnace.

Then put the fire and wood below and see that a plentiful fire is not lacking for the space of a day and a night. In the morning, however, take out the gold and melt it again, hammer it, and put it into the furnace as before. After another day and night take it out again, mix a little red copper with it, melt as before, and put it back into the furnace. And when you have taken it out a third time, wash it and carefully dry it. Weigh it, when dried, and see how much has been lost, then fold it up and keep it.

— Theophilus,

It was during the medieval period that distillation was discovered and the first description of nitric acid production was given by Pseudo-Geber in the Summa perfectionis, 1330. Nitric acid is able to dissolve silver. The addition of sal ammoniac to nitric acid creates aqua regia and this acid is able to dissolve gold. Both acids are used in the acid method of parting but the acids were expensive so were not used until the post medieval period.

=== Post medieval to modern period ===
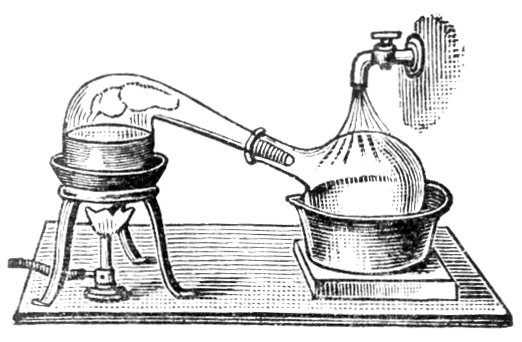
Distillation using an alembic

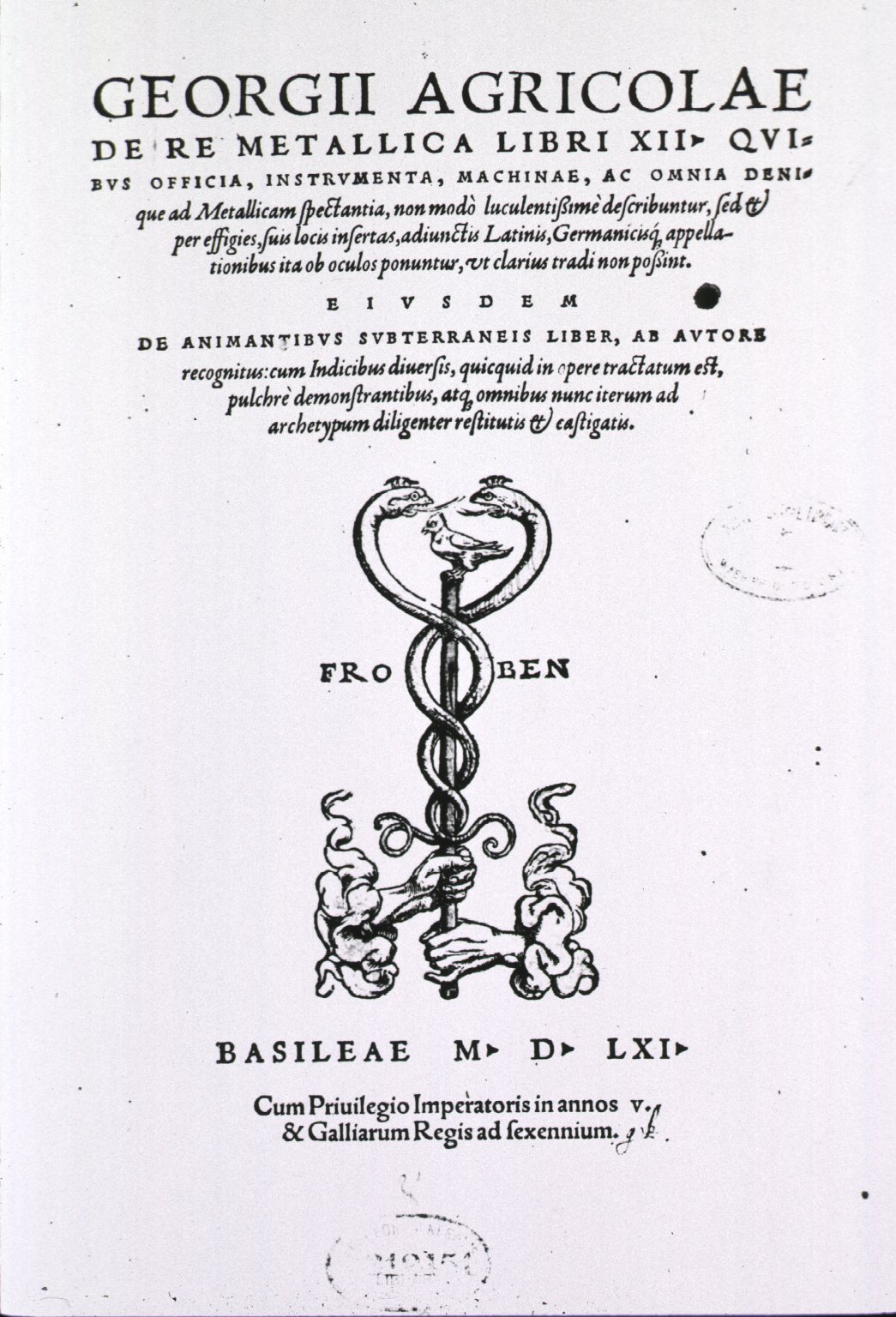
Title page of the 1556 edition of Agricola's De Re Metallica

Comprehensive accounts of the salt cementation processes is given by Biringuccio in his The Method of cementing gold and of Bringing it to its Ultimate Fineness.; in the Probierbuchlein – Little Books on Assaying; by Georgius Agricola in book 10 of De Re Metallica; and by Ercker in his Treatise on ores and assaying. This was a period where new techniques began to be explored. Granulation of the gold instead of gold foil increased surface area and therefore the efficiency of the reaction. Salt cementation continued to be the main method of parting until the 16th century but in later Middle Ages processes using sulfur, antimony and mineral acids began to be used. There are archaeological finds at sites in London of distillation vessels for making acids in Britain from the 15th century which include fragments of ceramic cucurbits (vessels for heating reacting chemicals) which were used with alembics for distillation. By the 18th century cementation was rarely used and had been replaced by acid treatment. Into modern times the acid parting method continued to be used but other methods were discovered. In 1860s Australia the Miller process was developed, this removed silver by bubbling chlorine gas through the molten gold mixture. Soon after, in the 1870s, electrolytic refining of gold was developed, the Wohlwill process, to deal with the problem of removing platinum from the gold. This technique is the most commonly used today for processing alloys start with relatively pure gold. These latest processes have been employed for over 100 years. For some years a new AcidLess Separation ALS process, based on the vacuum distillation method, has been used; it is a physical method, which does not use any chemical and therefore considered the greenest and sustainble of the gold parting processes.

=== Historic processes ===
==== Salt cementation ====
This process was used from Lydian to post-medieval times. It is a solid state process relying on common salt as the active ingredient but it is possible to use a mixture of saltpetre (KNO_{3}) and green vitriol (FeSO_{4}). The basic process involved the mixing of argentiferous gold foil (in later periods granules were used), common salt and brick dust or burnt clay in a closed and sealed container. Theophilus mentions the addition of urine to the mix. With heating, the silver reacts with the salt to form silver chloride which is removed leaving a purified gold behind. Conditions needed for this process are below 1000 °C as the gold should not melt. Silver can be recovered by smelting the debris. Heating can take 24 hours. Hoover and Hoover explains the process thus: under heating salt (sodium chloride, NaCl) decomposes in the presence of silica and alumina (from the brick dust or clay) to produce hydrochloric acid and also some chlorine. This reacts with the silver to produce silver chloride (AgCl). The urine is acidic and aids decomposition. Silver chloride is volatile and would be removed from the metal. And the container is sealed to stop the escape of the silver which can be recovered later. Notton in experiments found that with one heating the gold content could be taken from 37.5% to 93%

==== Sulfur and antimony processes ====
Separation of gold and silver by sulfur, De Re Metallica 1556

This is similar to the salt cementation process but creates sulfides instead of chlorides. Finely divided impure gold and elemental sulfur are reacted together under moderate heat in a sealed crucible. The impurities form metal sulfides and the gold is left unreacted. The gaseous sulfide condenses on the crucible fabric. The antimony process is the same but uses stibnite (Sb_{2}S_{3}) instead of sulfur because stibnite is stable at a higher temperature than sulfur. This is much quicker than the salt process and gave a purer gold, but it could dissolve some of the gold as well. This process is first described in the Probierbuchlein.

==== Acid parting ====
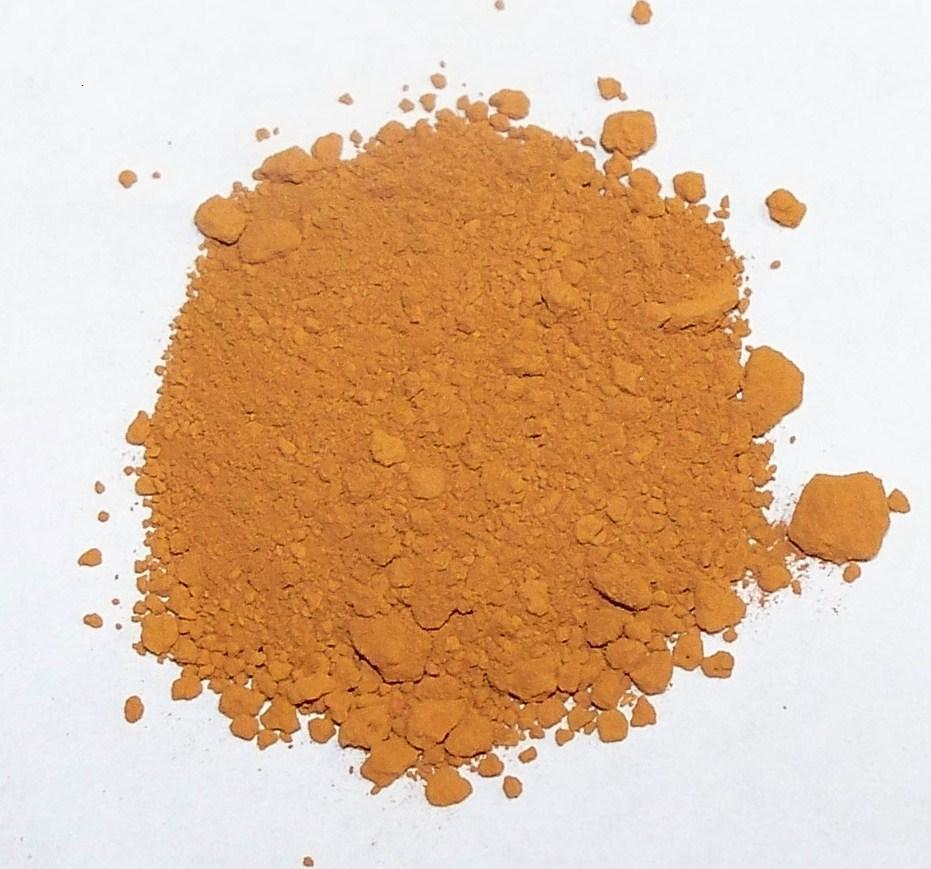
Pure gold precipitate produced by the aqua regia refining process

The distillation was used in the 12th century Europe after its introduction from the East and after that period more powerful acids could be created. Nitric acid (aqua fortis, called by Agricola aqua valens) could be made by the distillation of saltpetre (KNO_{3}) with water and alum (KAl(SO_{4})_{2}) or vitriol (FeSO_{4}).

2KNO_{3} + H_{2}O + FeSO_{4} → FeO + K_{2}SO_{4} + 2HNO_{3}

Nitric acid, after distillation to increase the acid strength, is capable of dissolving the silver but it will not (by itself) dissolve the gold. However, nitric acid is not able to (fully) extract silver and other impurities from an alloy with a high content of gold. Therefore, one part of scrap gold was typically alloyed with three parts of copper (quartering) before parting with nitric acid. Another method uses Sterling silver instead of copper. One part pure gold is alloyed with three parts Sterling silver (inquarting). The resulting six karat (6K) gold can then be parted with dilute nitric acid (one part 68–70% nitric acid to one part distilled water). With the karat gold this low (6K), and over medium high heat, the dilute nitric acid will dissolve the Sterling silver (and other base metals in the karat gold) starting on the outside surface of the 6K gold alloy, working its way into the gold alloy, forming a honeycomb structure as it works its way into the metals. Since nitric acid will not dissolve gold, nearly pure gold (very close to 99.5% pure) will be left behind after the reaction is complete. After removing the solid gold other elements like silver and copper may be extracted from the liquid. To get the gold to a very high level of purity (999 fine gold) it is sometimes processed further with aqua regia to effectively remove all the impurities.

Aqua regia was also used for parting. It was made by adding sal ammoniac to nitric acid which produced a mixture of hydrochloric acid and nitric acid. This acid dissolved the gold to a soluble chloride and the silver was attacked and precipitated as an insoluble chloride. Silver was removed by filtering and gold was then recovered by evaporating the liquid and heating the residue. Nitric acid was suitable for separating small quantities of gold from silver and aqua regia used to separate small quantities of silver from gold. Aqua regia acid process is used by refiners of scrap gold used in jewelry manufacturing. This process is also well suited to recycling consumers' used or broken jewelry directly back onto the global market 24kt inventory.

==== Acid-Less Separation vacuum distillation process ====
This process separates metals from the base metal by evaporating the more volatile metals; primarily silver, but also impurities such as zinc, arsenic, bismuth, cadmium, sulfur, and other elements, according to the thermodynamic and kinetic equations cited below$P_i = a_i \cdot P_i^0 \qquad a_i = \gamma_i \cdot x_i$ | $\ln P = -RT \Delta H_{vap} + C$ | $\dot{m} = \alpha \cdot \frac{(P_{eq} - P)}{\sqrt{2 \pi M R T}}$ | $K = \frac{\gamma_B \cdot x_B \cdot P_A^0}{\gamma_A \cdot x_A \cdot P_R^0}$

The metals are automatically separated in one or more processing steps/cycles, recovering the more volatile metals through distillation/condensation on one or more water-cooled condensers/collectors.

The silver is separated and condensed on dedicated condensers, while impurities such as zinc, arsenic, bismuth, cadmium, sulfur, and other elements are separated and condensed in a dedicated condenser.

== See also ==
- Cupellation
- Gold
- Gold extraction
- Gold mining
- Metallurgical assay
