= Fluoride volatility =

Tendency of highly fluorinated molecules to vaporize

Fluoride volatility is the tendency of highly fluorinated molecules to vaporize at comparatively low temperatures. Heptafluorides, hexafluorides and pentafluorides have much lower boiling points than the lower-valence fluorides. Most difluorides and trifluorides have high boiling points, while most tetrafluorides and monofluorides fall in between. The term "fluoride volatility" is jargon used particularly in the context of separation of radionuclides.

== Volatility and valence ==
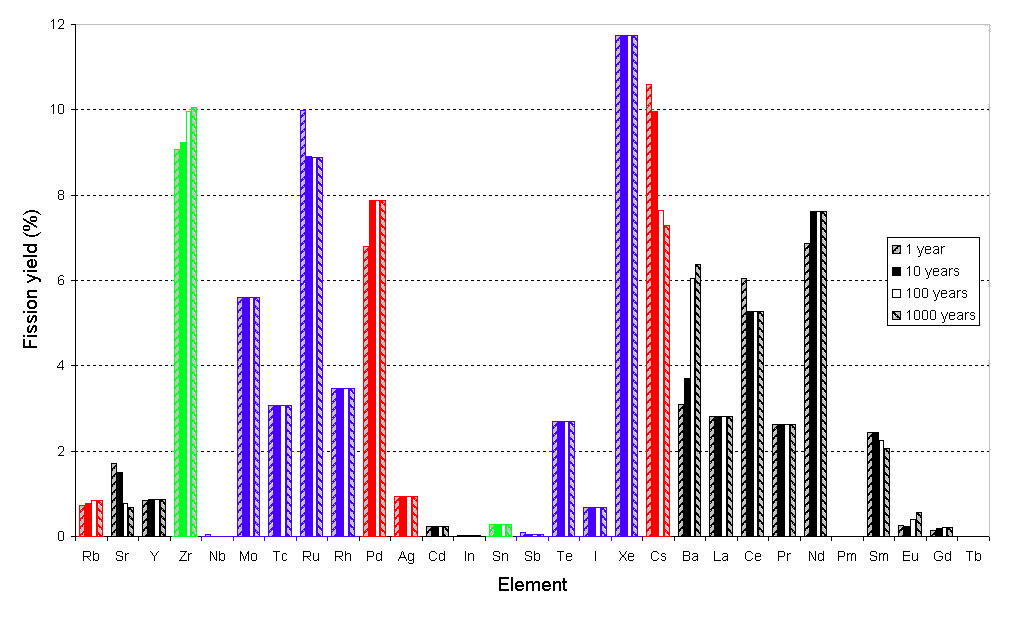
Blue elements have volatile fluorides or are already volatile; green elements do not but have volatile chlorides; red elements have neither, but the elements themselves are volatile at very high temperatures. Yields at 10^{0,1,2,3} years after fission, not considering later neutron capture, fraction of 100% not 200%. Beta decay Kr-85→Rb, Sr-90→Zr, Ru-106→Pd, Sb-125→Te, Cs-137→Ba, Ce-144→Nd, Sm-151→Eu, Eu-155→Gd visible.

Valences for the majority of elements are based on the highest known fluoride. However, elements with high valence tend to reach higher oxidation state in compounds with oxygen rather than fluorine.

Roughly, fluoride volatility can be used to remove elements with a valence of 5 or greater: uranium, neptunium, plutonium, metalloids (tellurium, antimony), nonmetals (selenium), halogens (iodine, bromine), and the middle transition metals (niobium, molybdenum, technetium, ruthenium, and possibly rhodium). This fraction includes the actinides most easily reusable as nuclear fuel in a thermal reactor, and the two long-lived fission products best suited to disposal by transmutation, Tc-99 and I-129, as well as Se-79.

Noble gases (xenon, krypton) are volatile even without fluoridation, and will not condense except at much lower temperatures.

Left behind are alkali metals (caesium, rubidium), alkaline earth metals (strontium, barium), lanthanides, the remaining actinides (americium, curium), remaining transition metals (yttrium, zirconium, palladium, silver) and post-transition metals (tin, indium, cadmium). This fraction contains the fission products that are radiation hazards on a scale of decades (Cs-137, Sr-90, Sm-151), the four remaining long-lived fission products Cs-135, Zr-93, Pd-107, Sn-126 of which only the last emits strong radiation, most of the neutron poisons, and the higher actinides (americium, curium, californium) that are radiation hazards on a scale of hundreds or thousands of years and are difficult to work with because of gamma radiation but are fissionable in a fast reactor. Americium finds use in ionization smoke detectors while californium is used as a spontaneous fission based neutron source. Curium has only very limited uses outside nuclear reactors. Fissionable but non-fissile actinoids can be used or disposed of in a subcritical nuclear reactor using an external neutron source such as an Accelerator Driven System.

== Reprocessing methods ==
Uranium oxides react with fluorine to form gaseous uranium hexafluoride, most of the plutonium reacts to form gaseous plutonium hexafluoride, a majority of fission products (especially electropositive elements: lanthanides, strontium, barium, yttrium, caesium) form nonvolatile fluorides. Few metals in the fission products (the transition metals niobium, ruthenium, technetium, molybdenum, and the halogen iodine) form volatile (boiling point <200 °C) fluorides that accompany the uranium and plutonium hexafluorides, together with inert gases. Distillation is then used to separate the uranium hexafluoride from the mixture.

The nonvolatile alkaline fission products and minor actinides fraction is most suitable for further processing with 'dry' electrochemical processing (pyrochemical) non-aqueous methods. The lanthanide fluorides are difficult to dissolve in the nitric acid used for aqueous reprocessing methods, such as PUREX, DIAMEX and SANEX, which use solvent extraction. Fluoride volatility is only one of several pyrochemical processes designed to reprocess used nuclear fuel.

The Řež nuclear research institute at Řež in the Czech Republic tested screw dosers that fed ground uranium oxide (simulating used fuel pellets) into a fluorinator where the particles were burned in fluorine gas to form uranium hexafluoride.

Hitachi has developed a technology, called FLUOREX, which combines fluoride volatility, to extract uranium, with more traditional solvent extraction (PUREX), to extract plutonium and other transuranics. The FLUOREX-based fuel cycle is intended for use with the Reduced moderation water reactor.

Some fluorides are water soluble while others aren't (see the solubility table) and can be separated in aqueous solution. However, all aqueous processes that take place without complete removal of tritium (a common product of ternary fission) prior to addition of water will contaminate the water with tritiated water which is difficult to remove from water. Some elements which form soluble florides form insoluble chlorides. Addition of a suitable soluble chloride (e.g. sodium chloride) will salt out those cations. One example is silver (I) fluoride (water soluble) which forms silver chloride precipitate upon addition of a soluble chloride.

AgF + NaCl → AgCl↓ + NaF

Some fluorides react aggressively with water and may form highly corrosive hydrogen fluoride. This needs to be taken into account if aqueous processes involving fluorides are to be used.

If desired, a series of further anion-additions similar to the de:Kationentrennungsgang can be used to separate out different cations for disposal, further processing or use.

== Table of relevant properties ==
Fluoride	Z	Boiling °C	Melting °C	Key halflife	Yield
HF	1	19.5	−83.6	T:12y	Common reagent
BF_{3}	5	−100.3	−126.8	none over 0.8 s	Neutron poison used for control
SeF_{6}	34	−46.6	−50.8	^{79}Se:327ky	.04%
TeF_{6}	52	−39	−38	^{127m}Te:109d	
IF_{7}	53	4.8 (1 atm)	6.5 (tripoint)	^{129}I:15.7my	0.54%
MoF_{6}	42	34	17.4	^{99}Mo:2.75d	
PuF_{6}	94	62	52	^{239}Pu:24ky	
TcF_{6}	43	55.3	37.4	^{99}Tc:213ky	6.1%
NpF_{6}	93	55.18	54.4	^{237}Np:2.14my	
UF_{6}	92	56.5 (subl)	64.8	^{233}U:160ky	
RuF_{6}	44	200 (dec)	54	^{106}Ru:374d	
RhF_{6}	45	73.5	70	^{103}Rh:stable	
ReF_{7}	75	73.72	48.3	Not FP	
BrF_{5}	35	40.25	−61.30	^{81}Br:stable	
IF_{5}	53	97.85	9.43	^{129}I:15.7my	0.54%
XeF_{2}	54	114.25 (subl)	129.03 (tripoint)		
SbF_{5}	51	141	8.3	^{125}Sb:2.76y	
RuOF_{4}	44	184	115	^{106}Ru:374d	
RuF_{5}	44	227	86.5	^{106}Ru:374d	
NbF_{5}	41	234	79	^{95}Nb:35d	low
PdF_{4}	46			^{107}Pd:6.5my	
SnF_{4}	50	750 (subl)	705	^{121m1}Sn:44y^{126}Sn:230ky	0.013% ?
ZrF_{4}	40	905	932 (tripoint)	^{93}Zr:1.5my	6.35%
AgF	47	1159	435	^{109}Ag:stable	
CsF	55	1251	682	^{137}Cs:30.2y^{135}Cs:2.3my	6.19% 6.54%
BeF_{2}	4	1327	552	^{10}Be:1.4my	
RbF	37	1410	795		
UF_{4}	92	1417	1036	^{233}U:160ky	
FLiBe		1430	459	stable	
FLiNaK		1570	454	stable	
LiF	3	1676	848	stable	
KF	19	1502	858	^{40}K:1.25Gy	
NaF	11	1704	993	stable	
ThF_{4}	90	1680	1110		
CdF_{2}	48	1748	1110	^{113m}Cd:14.1y	
YF_{3}	39	2230	1150	^{91}Y:58.51d	
InF_{3}	49	>1200	1170		
BaF_{2}	56	2260	1368	^{140}Ba:12.75d	
TbF_{3}	65	2280	1172		
GdF_{3}	64		1231	^{159}Gd:18.5h	
PmF_{3}	61		1338	^{147}Pm:2.62y	
EuF_{3}	63	2280	1390	^{155}Eu:4.76y	
NdF_{3}	60	2300	1374	^{147}Nd:11d	
PrF_{3}	59		1395	^{143}Pr:13.57d	
CeF_{3}	58	2327	1430	^{144}Ce:285d	
SmF_{3}	62	2427	1306	^{151}Sm:90y	0.419% ?
SrF_{2}	38	2460	1477	^{90}Sr: 29.1y	5.8%
LaF_{3}	57		1493	^{140}La:1.68d	

== See also ==
- FLiNaK
- Molten salt reactor

== Notes ==
- Missing top fluorides:
  - PrF_{4} (because it decomposes at 90 °C)
  - TbF_{4} (because it decomposes at 300 °C)
  - CeF_{4} (because it decomposes at 600 °C)
- Without stable fluorides: Kr (KrF_{2} has a decomposition rate of 10% per hour at room temperature)
