= Cooling system =

Cooling system may refer to:

- Cooling systems for buildings, part of HVAC technology
- Cooling systems for vehicles, such as internal combustion engine cooling
- Cooling systems for nuclear powerplants, using nuclear reactor coolant
- Cooling systems for computer equipment, see computer cooling
