= Nuclear reactor coolant =

Coolant in a nuclear reactor

Nuclear reactor coolants
Coolant	Melting point	Boiling point
Heavy water at 154 bar		345 °C
NaK eutectic	–11 °C	785 °C
Sodium	97.72 °C	883 °C
FLiNaK	454 °C	1570 °C
FLiBe	459 °C	1430 °C
Lead	327.46 °C	1749 °C
Lead-bismuth eutectic	123.5 °C	1670 °C

A nuclear reactor coolant is a fluid that carries heat away from the core of a nuclear reactor. The heat is used to generate electricity, and any excess is released to the environment. Many plants use two coolant loops: a primary loop that passes through the core and becomes radioactive, and a secondary loop that drives the turbines. Most nuclear power plants are light water reactors. They use ordinary water under high pressure as both coolant and neutron moderator. In pressurized water reactors the water stays liquid, and in boiling water reactors it turns to steam inside the reactor. Heavy water reactors use deuterium oxide, which absorbs fewer neutrons. In pressurized water reactors, boric acid is dissolved in the water to absorb neutrons, so operators can control the reaction by changing its concentration. Water coolants have drawbacks. Neutron exposure can turn some of the hydrogen into radioactive tritium, which can leak into groundwater. If cooling fails, overheated fuel can react with steam to make hydrogen, which can explode, as it did at Fukushima Daiichi. Fast reactors need fast neutrons, so they avoid water. Most use liquid sodium, and some use lead, lead–bismuth or molten salts. Helium has been used as a gas coolant. Organic coolants were tried early on but were not successful.

== Water ==
Almost all currently operating nuclear power plants are light water reactors using ordinary water under high pressure as coolant and neutron moderator. About 1/3 are boiling water reactors where the primary coolant undergoes phase transition to steam inside the reactor. About 2/3 are pressurized water reactors at even higher pressure. Current reactors stay under the critical point at around 374 °C and 218 bar where the distinction between liquid and gas disappears, which limits thermal efficiency, but the proposed supercritical water reactor would operate above this point.

Heavy water reactors use deuterium oxide which has identical properties to ordinary water but much lower neutron capture, allowing more thorough moderation.

=== Disadvantages ===
==== Tritium leak ====
As the hydrogen atoms in water coolants are bombarded with neutrons, some absorb a neutron to become deuterium, and then some become radioactive tritium. Water contaminated with tritium sometimes leaks to groundwater by accident or by official approval.

==== Hydrogen explosion ====
Fuel rods create high temperatures which boil water into steam. During a power outage, diesel power generators which provide emergency power to water pumps may be damaged by a tsunami, earthquake or both; if no fresh water is being pumped to cool the fuel rods then the fuel rods continue to heat up. Once the fuel rods reach more than 1200°C, the zirconium tubes that contain the nuclear fuel will interact with the steam and split hydrogen from water molecules. This hydrogen may leak from breaches in the reactor core and containment vessel. If hydrogen accumulates in sufficient quantities – concentrations of 4% or more in the air – then it can explode, as has apparently occurred at Fukushima Daiichi reactors No. 1, 3, and 4.

Such an explosion was avoided at Reactor No. 2, which opened its vent to let out hydrogen, decreasing pressure by releasing radioactive hydrogen gas.

== Borated water ==
Borated water is ordinary water with boric acid dissolved in it. In a pressurized water reactor (PWR), the primary coolant carries boric acid as a neutron absorber, known as a "chemical shim". Boron-10 absorbs neutrons strongly, so adding boric acid (boration) lowers reactivity, and adding unborated water (dilution) raises it. Operators use this to offset fuel burnup and xenon build-up over a fuel cycle, while control rods handle fast changes. Because the boron dissolves evenly, it does not distort the neutron flux across the core.

It is used in Emergency Core Cooling Systems (ECCS) of both PWRs and Boiling water reactors (BWRs).

=== Advantages ===
Boron, often in the form of boric acid or sodium borate, is combined with water — a cheap and plentiful resource — where it acts as a coolant to remove heat from the reactor core and transfers the heat to a secondary circuit. Part of the secondary circuit is the steam generator that is used to turn turbines and generate electricity. Borated water also provides the additional benefits of acting as a neutron poison due to its large neutron absorption cross-section, where it absorbs excess neutrons to help control the fission rate of the reactor. Thus, the reactivity of the nuclear reactor can be easily adjusted by changing the boron concentration in the coolant. That is, when the boron concentration is increased (boration) by dissolving more boric acid into the coolant, the reactivity of the reactor is decreased. Conversely, when the boron concentration is decreased (dilution) by adding more water, the reactivity of the reactor is increased.

=== Disadvantages ===
Approximately 90% of the tritium in PWR coolants is produced by reactions of boron-10 with neutrons. Since tritium itself is a radioactive isotope of hydrogen, the coolant becomes contaminated with radioactive isotopes and must be kept from leaking into the environment. Additionally, this effect must be taken into account for longer cycles of nuclear reactor operation and thus requires higher initial concentration of boron in the coolant.

== Molten metal ==
Fast reactors have a high power density and do not need, and must avoid, neutron moderation. Most have been liquid metal cooled reactors using molten sodium. Lead, lead-bismuth eutectic, and other metals have also been proposed and occasionally used. Mercury was used in the first fast reactor.

== Molten salt ==
Molten salts share with metals the advantage of low vapor pressure even at high temperatures, and are less chemically reactive than sodium. Salts containing light elements like FLiBe can also provide moderation. In the Molten-Salt Reactor Experiment it even served as a solvent carrying the nuclear fuel.

== Gas ==
Gases have also been used as coolant. Helium is extremely inert both chemically and with respect to nuclear reactions but has a low heat capacity.

== Hydrocarbons ==
Organically moderated and cooled reactors were an early concept studied, using hydrocarbons as coolant. They were not successful.
