= Trifluoride =

Trifluorides are compounds in which one atom or ion has three fluorine atoms or ions associated. Many metals form trifluorides, such as iron, the rare-earth elements, and the metals in the groups 3, 13 and 15 of the periodic table. Most metal trifluorides are poorly soluble in water except ferric fluoride and indium(III) fluoride, but several are soluble in other solvents.

== List of trifluorides ==
- Actinium trifluoride, AcF_{3}
- Aluminium trifluoride, AlF_{3}
- Americium trifluoride, AmF_{3}
- Antimony trifluoride, SbF_{3}, sometimes called Swart's reagent
- Arsenic trifluoride, AsF_{3}
- Berkelium trifluoride, BkF_{3}
- Bismuth trifluoride, BiF_{3}
- Boron trifluoride, BF_{3}, a pungent colourless toxic gas
- Bromotrifluoromethane, CBrF_{3}, (carbon monobromide trifluoride)
- Bromine trifluoride, BrF_{3}
- Californium trifluoride, CaF_{3}
- Carbon trifluoride, C_{2}F_{6}, Hexafluoroethane
- Cerium trifluoride, CeF_{3}
- Chlorine trifluoride, ClF_{3}
- Chromium trifluoride, CrF_{3}
- Cobalt trifluoride, CoF_{3}
- Curium trifluoride, CmF_{3}
- Diethylaminosulfur trifluoride (DAST) is the organosulfur compound with the formula Et_{2}NSF_{3}
- Dysprosium trifluoride, DyF_{3}
- Einsteinium trifluoride, EsF_{3}
- Europium trifluoride, EuF_{3}
- Erbium trifluoride, ErF_{3}
- Fluoroform (trifluoromethane), CHF_{3}
- Gadolinium trifluoride, GdF_{3}
- Gallium trifluoride, GaF_{3}
- Gold trifluoride, AuF_{3}
- Holmium trifluoride, HoF_{3}
- Indium trifluoride, InF_{3}
- Iodine trifluoride, IF_{3}, a yellow solid which decomposes above −28 °C
- Iridium trifluoride, IrF_{3}
- Iron trifluoride, FeF_{3}
- Lanthanum trifluoride, LaF_{3}
- Lutetium trifluoride, LuF_{3}
- Manganese trifluoride, MnF_{3}
- Neodymium trifluoride, NdF_{3}
- Neptunium trifluoride, NpF_{3}
- Nitrogen trifluoride, NF_{3}, a colorless, toxic, odourless, nonflammable gas
- Palladium(II,IV) fluoride, Pd[PF_{6}], empirical formula PdF_{3}
- Phosphorus trifluoride, PF_{3}, a colorless and odorless gas
- Plutonium trifluoride, PuF_{3}
- Praseodymium trifluoride, PrF_{3}
- Promethium trifluoride, PmF_{3}
- Rhodium trifluoride, RhF_{3}
- Samarium trifluoride, SmF_{3}
- Scandium trifluoride, ScF_{3}
- Silver trifluoride, AgF_{3}, an unstable, bright-red, diamagnetic compound
- Sulfur trifluoride, SF_{3,} has radical, unstable
- Terbium trifluoride, TbF_{3}
- Thallium trifluoride, TlF_{3}
- Thiazyl trifluoride, NSF_{3}, a stable, colourless gas, and important precursor to other sulfur-nitrogen-fluorine compounds
- Thiophosphoryl trifluoride, PSF_{3}, colourless gas spontaneously burning with a very cool flame
- Thulium trifluoride, TmF_{3}
- Titanium trifluoride, TiF_{3}
- Uranium trifluoride, UF_{3}
- Vanadium trifluoride, VF_{3}
- Vanadium(V) oxytrifluoride, VOF_{3}
- Ytterbium trifluoride, YbF_{3}
- Yttrium trifluoride, YF_{3}
