= Monofluoride =

A monofluoride is a chemical compound with one fluoride per formula unit. For a binary compound, this is the formula XF.

== Organofluorine compounds ==
Common monofluoride are organofluorine compounds such as methyl fluoride and fluorobenzene.

== Inorganic compounds ==
All the alkali metals form monofluorides. All have the sodium chloride (rock salt) structure and are soluble in water and even some alcohols. Because the fluoride anion is highly basic, many alkali metal fluorides form bifluorides with the formula MHF_{2}. Sodium and potassium bifluorides are significant to the chemical industry. Among other monofluorides, only silver(I) and thallium(I) fluorides are well-characterized. Both are very soluble, unlike the other halides of those metals.

=== Selected inorganic monofluorides ===
Examples of the monofluorides include:

=== Metal monofluorides ===
- Aluminium monofluoride, an elusive species with the formula AlF
- Caesium fluoride
- Copper monofluoride
- Lithium fluoride
- Mercury monofluoride
- Potassium fluoride
- Rubidium fluoride
- Silver fluoride
- Sodium fluoride
- Thallium monofluoride

=== Nonmetal monofluorides ===
- Boron monofluoride or fluoroborylene has the formula BF
- Bromine monofluoride, a liquid interhalogen compound with formula BrF
- Carbon monofluoride (CF, CF_{x}, or (CF)_{x}), also called polycarbon monofluoride
- Chlorine monofluoride, a volatile interhalogen compound with formula ClF
- Iodine monofluoride, a chocolate-brown solid compound with formula IF
- Hydrogen fluoride, a liquid or gas with boiling point at about 20 °C, HF
- Nitrogen monofluoride, a metastable compound with formula NF

== Bibliography ==
- Aigueperse, Jean; Mollard, Paul; Devilliers, Didier; Chemla, Marius; Faron, Robert; Romano, Renée; Cuer, Jean Pierre (2005). Ullmann (ed.). Encyclopedia of Industrial Chemistry. Wiley-VCH. p. 35. doi:10.1002/14356007. ISBN 978-3-527-30673-2.
- Greenwood, N. N.; Earnshaw, A. (1998). Chemistry of the Elements (second ed.). Butterworth Heinemann. ISBN 0-7506-3365-4.
