= FLiNaK =

Alkiline metal fluoride salt mixture

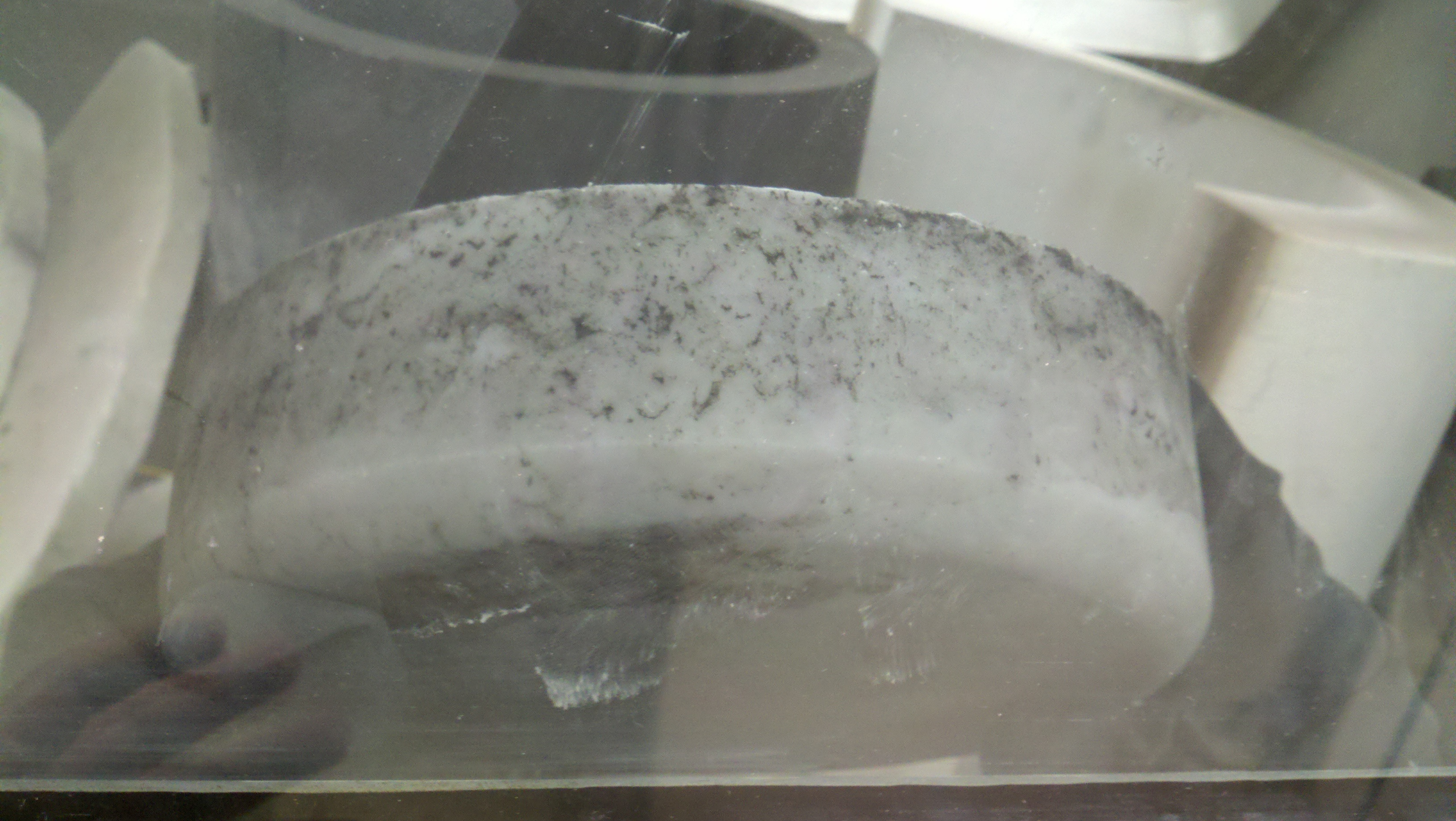
FLiNaK in solid form, located inside of a glove box. Note: FLiNaK is almost pure white when crystallized, the black specks and waves in this image are likely from graphite or SiC from the crucible used to melt the salt.

FLiNaK is the name of the ternary eutectic alkaline metal fluoride salt mixture LiF-NaF-KF (46.5-11.5-42 mol %). It has a melting point of 462 °C and a boiling point of 1570 °C. It is used as electrolyte for the electroplating of refractory metals and compounds like titanium, tantalum, hafnium, zirconium and their borides. FLiNaK also could see potential use as a coolant in the very high temperature reactor, a type of nuclear reactor.

== Coolant ==
FLiNaK salt was researched heavily during the late 1950s by Oak Ridge National Laboratory as potential candidate for a coolant in the molten salt reactor because of its low melting point, its high heat capacity, and its chemical stability at high temperatures. Ultimately, its sister salt, FLiBe, was chosen as the solvent salt for the molten salt reactor due to a more desirable nuclear cross section. FLiNaK still gathers interest as an intermediate coolant for a high-temperature molten salt reactor where it could transfer heat without being in the presence of the fuel.

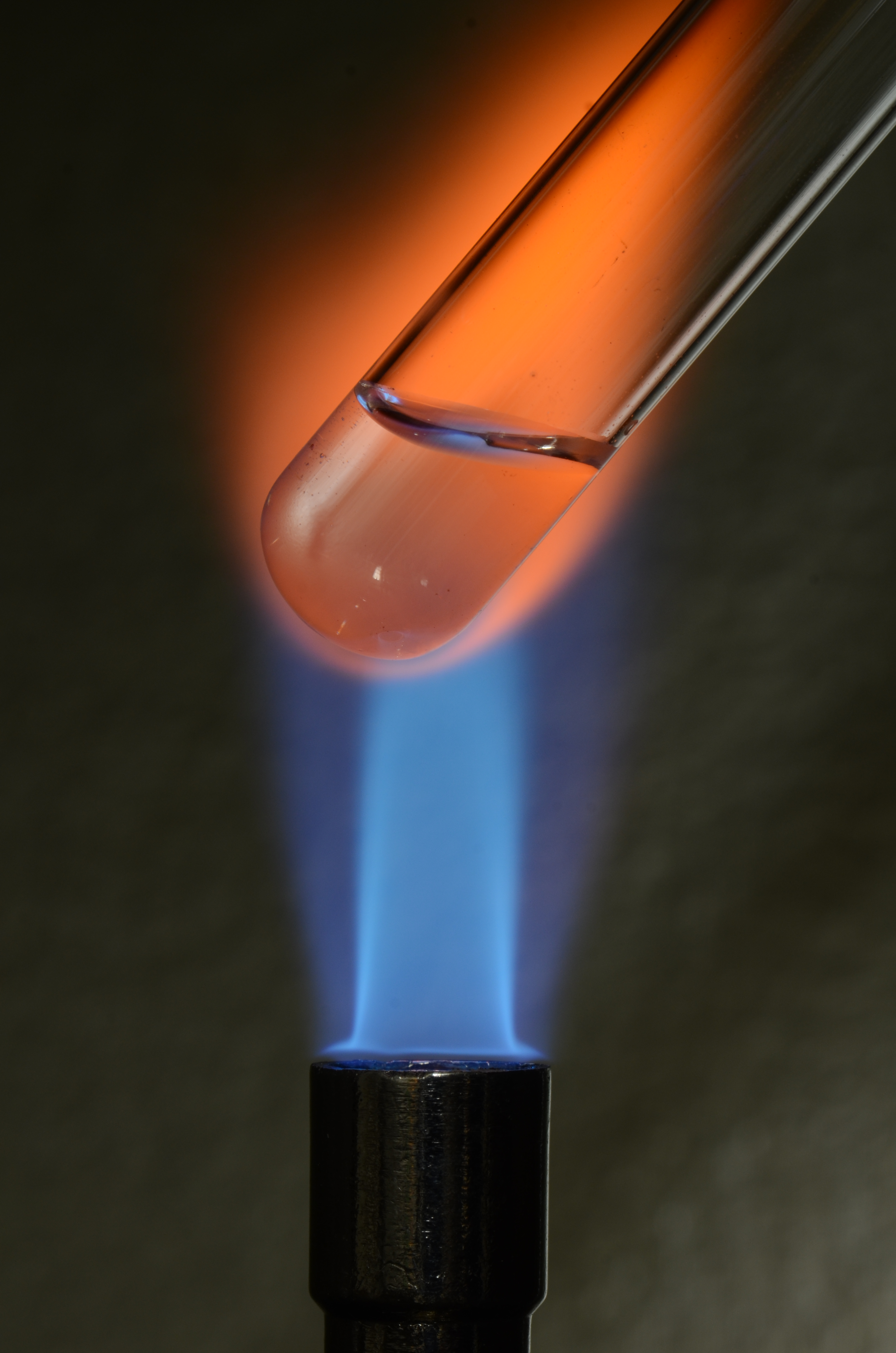
Molten FLiNaK salt in a test tube heated by a natural gas flame.

== Chemistry ==
Fluoride salts, like all salts, cause corrosion in most metals and alloys. FLiNaK is different from FLiBe in the sense that is a basic melt—or it has an excess of fluorine ions. As FLiNaK melts, all three components are alkali fluorides and therefore disassociate into positive and negative ions. The concentration of molten fluorine ions are able to corrode any metallic structures if it is energetically favorable. This is in contrast to FLiBe, which in a 66-34 mol% mixture will be a chemically neutral mix, as fluorine ions from LiF are donated to BeF_{2} to create the tetrafluoroberyllate ion BeF_{4}^{2−}.

== See also ==
- Molten salt reactor
- FLiBe
- Fluoride volatility
