= Neodymium(III) fluoride =

Inorganic chemical compound

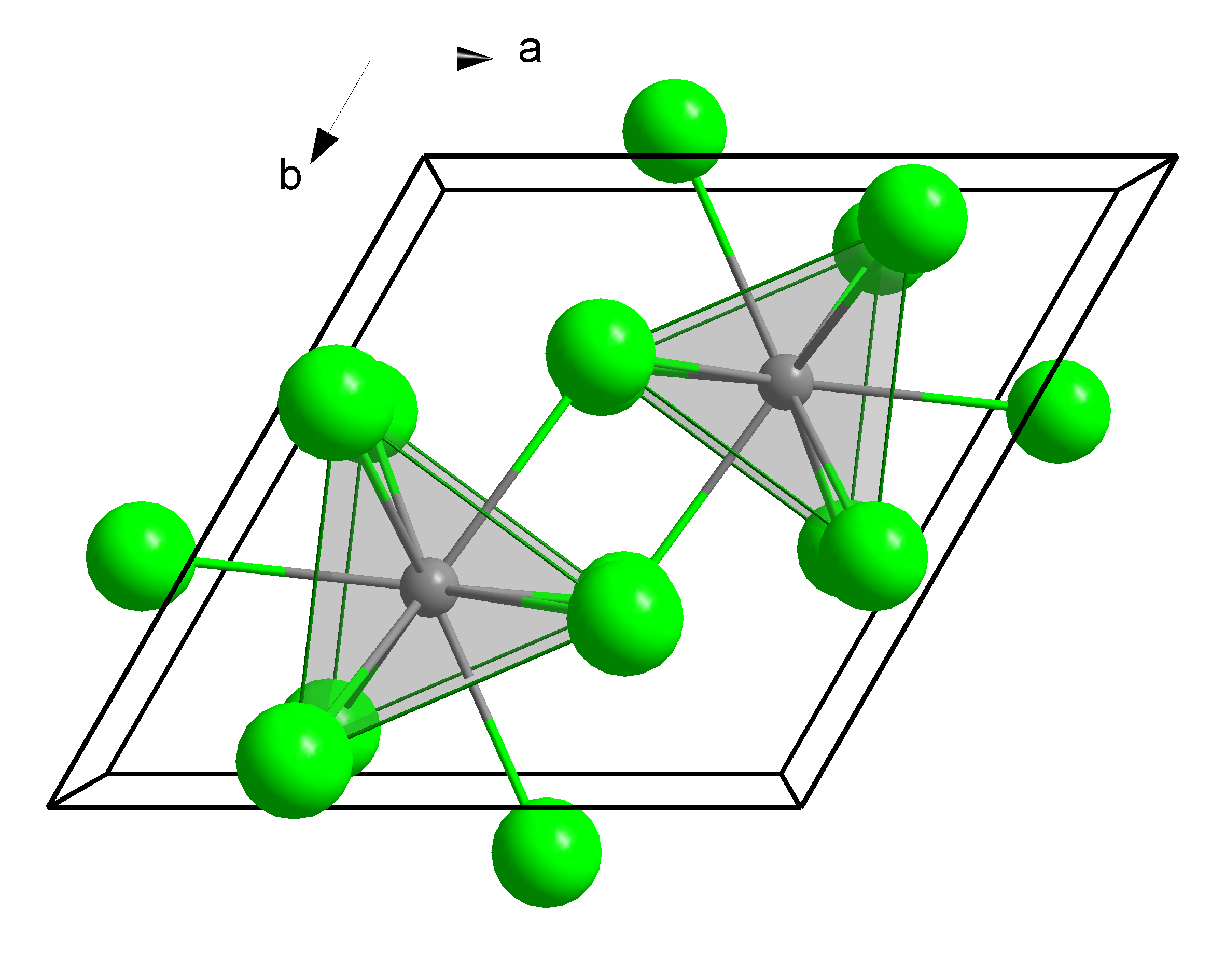

Names
- Other names Neodymium trifluoride

Identifiers
CAS Number	13709-42-7
3D model (JSmol)	Interactive image
ChemSpider	75499
ECHA InfoCard	100.033.852
EC Number	237-253-3
PubChem CID	83676
CompTox Dashboard (EPA)	DTXSID7065592
- InChI: InChI=1S/3FH.Nd/h3*1H;/q;;;+3/p-3 Key: XRADHEAKQRNYQQ-UHFFFAOYSA-K
- SMILES: F[Nd](F)F

Properties
Chemical formula	NdF_{3}
Molar mass	201.24 g/mol
Appearance	Vibrant pink/violet solid
Density	6.5g/cm^{3}
Melting point	1,374 °C (2,505 °F; 1,647 K)

Structure
Coordination geometry	Tricapped trigonal prismatic (nine-coordinate)

Hazards
- GHS labelling
Pictograms	(GHS07: Exclamation mark)
Signal word	Warning
Hazard statements	H302, H312, H315, H319, H332, H335
Precautionary statements	P261, P264, P270, P271, P280, P301+P312, P302+P352, P304+P312, P304+P340, P305+P351+P338, P312, P321, P322, P330, P332+P313, P337+P313, P362, P363, P403+P233, P405, P501
- Except where otherwise noted, data are given for materials in their standard state (at 25 °C [77 °F], 100 kPa). Infobox references

Neodymium(III) fluoride is an inorganic chemical compound of neodymium and fluorine with the formula NdF_{3}. It is a purplish pink colored solid with a high melting point.

== Preparation ==
Like other lanthanide fluorides it is highly insoluble in water which allows it to be synthesised from aqueous neodymium nitrate via a reaction with hydrofluoric acid, from which it precipitates as a hydrate:

Nd(NO_{3})_{3(aq)} + 3 HF → NdF_{3}•½H_{2}O + 3 HNO_{3}

It can also be obtained by the reaction of neodymium(III) oxide and hydrofluoric acid:

Nd_{2}O_{3} + 6HF → 2NdF_{3} + 3H_{2}O

Anhydrous material may be obtained by the simple drying of the hydrate, in contrast to the hydrates of other neodymium halides, which form mixed oxyhalides if heated.

== Uses ==
Neodymium(III) fluoride is often used in the manufacture of fluoride glasses.

When neodymium is extracted from ores, the fluoride is often an intermediate product and is then reduced to the solid metal chemically (e.g. by adding calcium, which produces calcium fluoride) or by fused-salt electrolysis.

== Other compounds ==
Neodymium(III) fluoride forms compounds with N_{2}H_{4}, such as NdF_{3}•3N_{2}H_{4}•3H_{2}O which is a white hexagonal crystal, soluble in water, slightly soluble in methanol and ethanol, with d20°C = 2.3547 g/cm^{3}.
