= Heptafluoride =

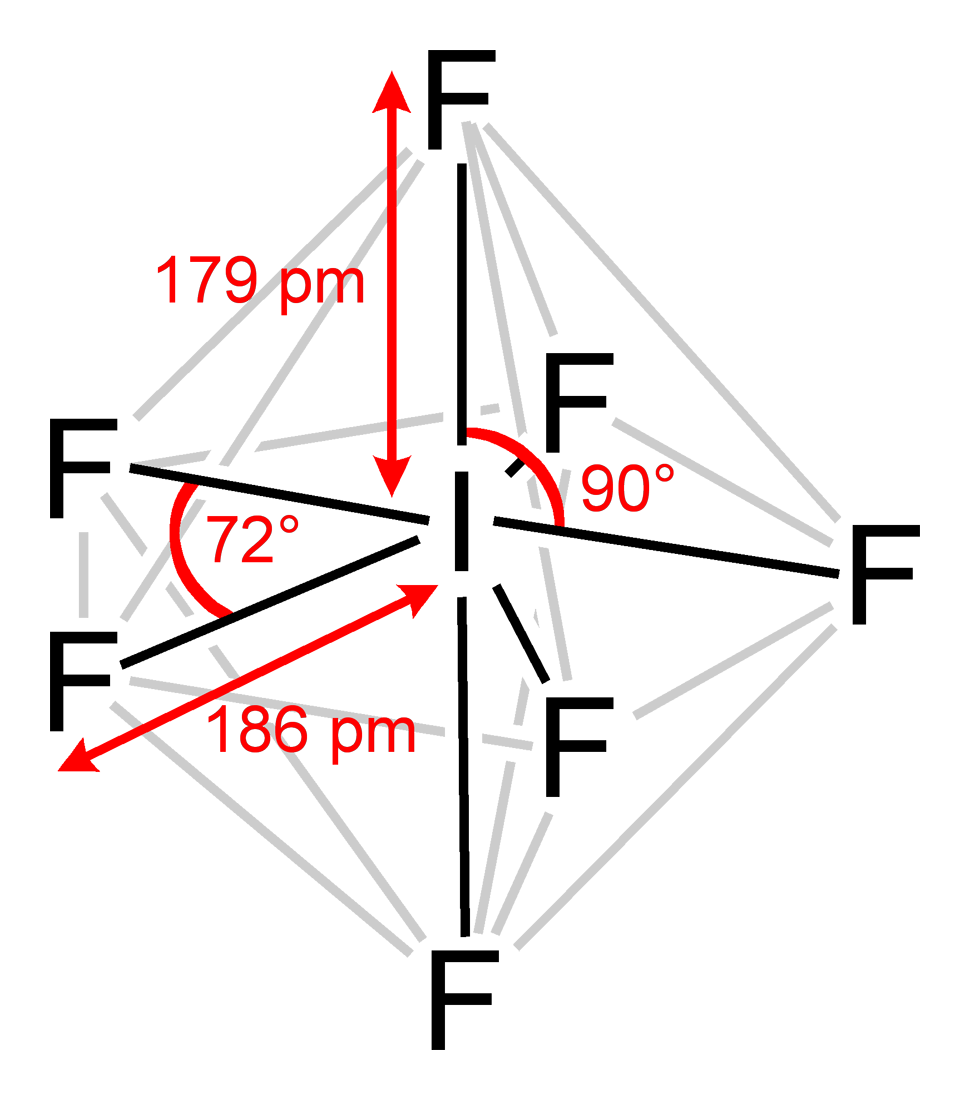
Iodine heptafluoride's pentagonal bipyramidal structure

Heptafluoride typically refers to compounds with the formula R_{n}M_{x}F_{7}^{y−} or R_{n}M_{x}F_{7}^{y+}, where n, x, and y are independent variables and R any substituent.

== Binary heptafluorides ==
The only binary heptafluorides are iodine heptafluoride (IF_{7}), rhenium heptafluoride (ReF_{7}), and gold heptafluoride (AuF_{7}). Only IF_{7} and ReF_{7} are true heptafluorides, however, as AuF_{7} is actually a coordination complex of gold pentafluoride (AuF_{5}) and molecular fluorine; therefore, the correct chemical formula of gold heptafluoride is actually AuF_{5}·F_{2}.

== Heptafluoride anions ==
A commercially important heptafluoride anion is the heptafluorotantalate anion, TaF_{7}^{2−}. It is an intermediate in the purification of tantalum. Many dimeric and oligomeric heptafluorides have been observed or proposed. One example is B_{2}F_{7}^{−}.

In the area of organofluorine chemistry, many heptafluorides are known. A prominent example is heptafluorobutyric acid. This species and its conjugate base heptafluorobutyrate (C_{3}F_{7}CO_{2}^{−}) are precursors to surfactants.

== Complex heptafluorides ==
Many compounds that are not discrete ions or molecules also are heptafluorides.
