= Lithium fluoride =

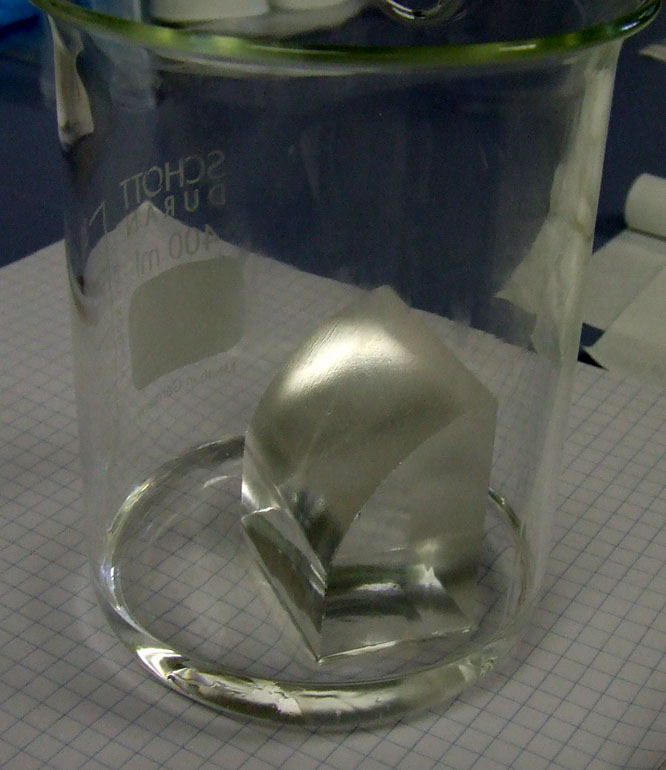
- Lithium fluoride boule

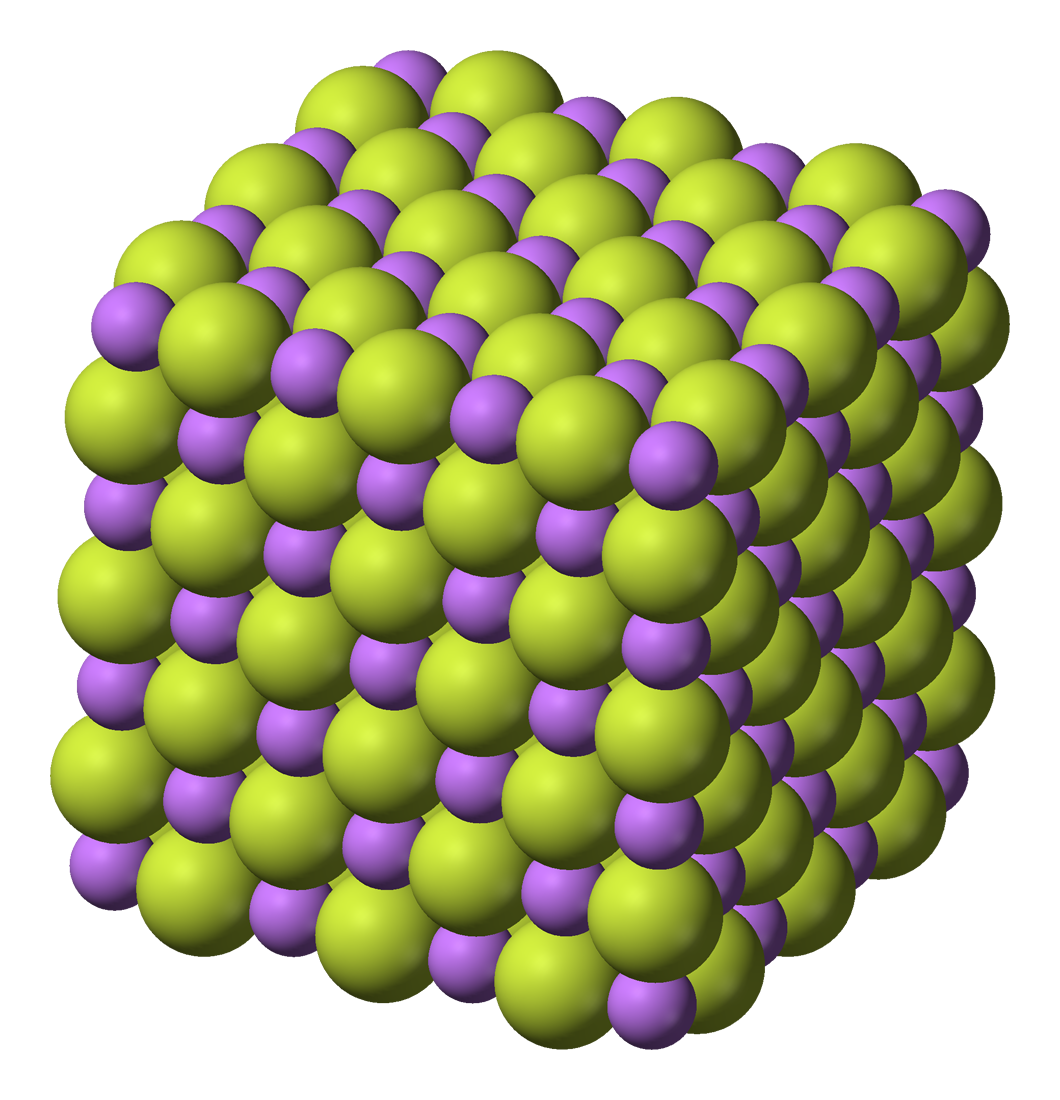
- Lithium fluoride __ Li^{+} __ F^{−}

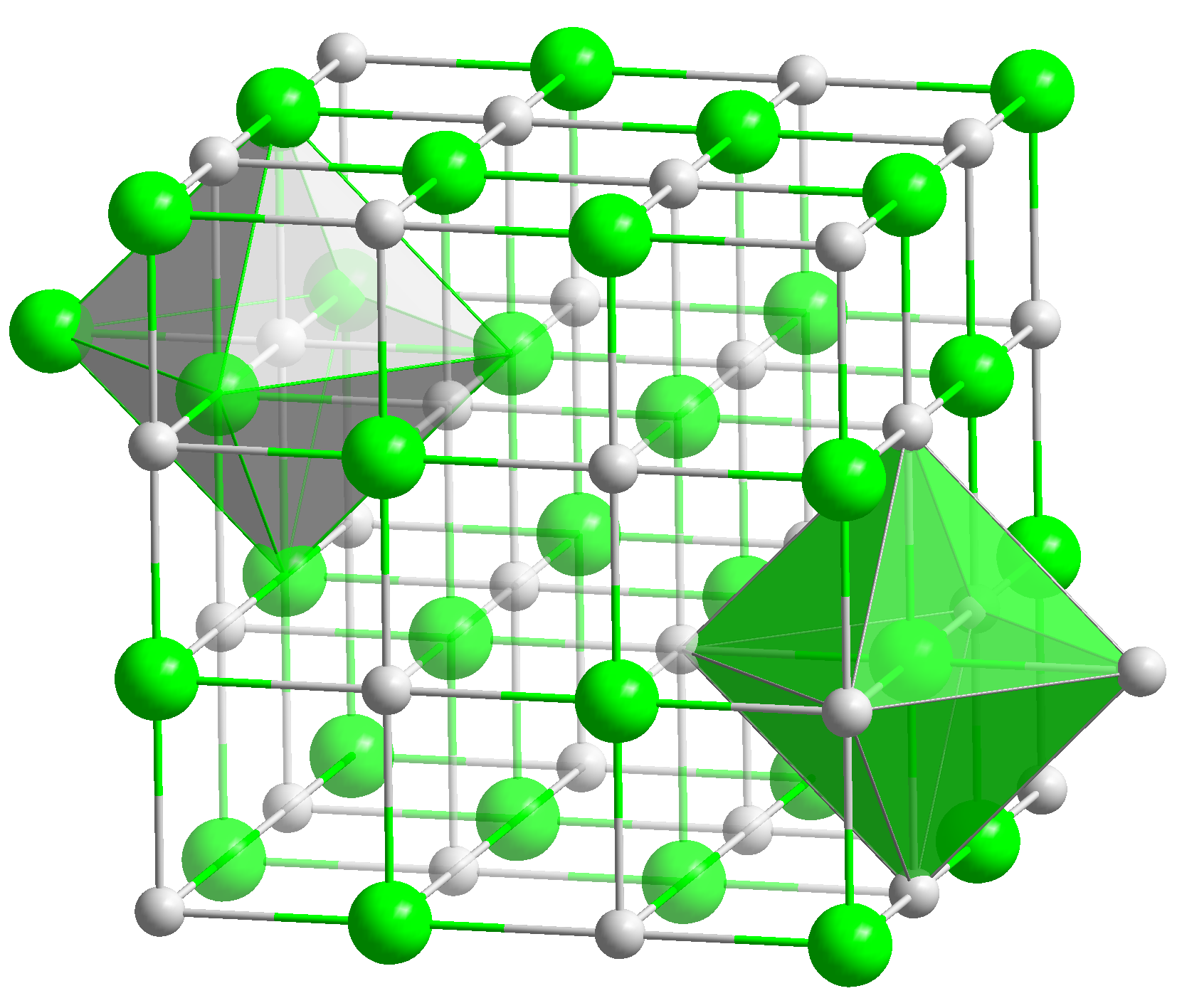
- __ Li^{+} __ F^{−}

Names
- IUPAC name Lithium fluoride

Identifiers
CAS Number	7789-24-4
3D model (JSmol)	Interactive image
ChemSpider	23007
ECHA InfoCard	100.029.229
EC Number	232-152-0
PubChem CID	224478
RTECS number	OJ6125000
UNII	1485XST65B
CompTox Dashboard (EPA)	DTXSID10894119
- InChI: InChI=1S/FH.Li/h1H;/q;+1/p-1 Key: PQXKHYXIUOZZFA-UHFFFAOYSA-M; InChI=1/FH.Li/h1H;/q;+1/p-1 Key: PQXKHYXIUOZZFA-REWHXWOFAG
- SMILES: [Li+].[F-]

Properties
Chemical formula	LiF
Molar mass	25.94 g·mol^{−1}
Appearance	White powder or colorless hygroscopic crystals
Density	2.635 g/cm^{3}
Melting point	845 °C (1,553 °F; 1,118 K)
Boiling point	1,676 °C (3,049 °F; 1,949 K)
Solubility in water	0.127 g/(100 mL) (18 °C); 0.134 g/(100 mL) (25 °C)
Solubility product (K_{sp})	1.84×10^{−3}
Solubility	soluble in HF insoluble in alcohol
Magnetic susceptibility (χ)	−10.1·10^{−6} cm^{3}/mol
Refractive index (n_{D})	1.3915

Structure
Crystal structure	Face-centered cubic
Lattice constant	a = 403.51 pm
Molecular shape	Linear

Thermochemistry
Heat capacity (C)	1.507 J/(g·K)
Std molar entropy (S^{⦵}_{298})	35.73 J/(mol·K)
Std enthalpy of formation (Δ_{f}H^{⦵}_{298})	−616 kJ/mol

Hazards
- GHS labelling
Pictograms	(GHS06: Toxic)
Signal word	Danger
Hazard statements	H301, H315, H319, H335
NFPA 704 (fire diamond)	3 0 0
- Lethal dose or concentration (LD, LC)
LD_{50} (median dose)	143 mg/kg (oral, rat)

Related compounds
Other anions	Lithium chloride Lithium bromide Lithium iodide Lithium astatide
Other cations	Sodium fluoride Potassium fluoride Rubidium fluoride Caesium fluoride Francium fluoride
- Except where otherwise noted, data are given for materials in their standard state (at 25 °C [77 °F], 100 kPa). verify (what is ?) Infobox references

Lithium fluoride is an inorganic compound with the chemical formula LiF. It is a colorless solid that transitions to white with decreasing crystal size. Its structure is analogous to that of sodium chloride, but it is much less soluble in water. It is mainly used as a component of molten salts. Partly because Li and F are both light elements, and partly because F_{2} is highly reactive, formation of LiF from the elements releases one of the highest energies per mass of reactants, second only to that of BeO.

== Manufacturing ==
LiF is prepared from lithium hydroxide or lithium carbonate with hydrogen fluoride.

== Applications ==
=== Precursor to lithium hexafluorophosphate for batteries ===
Lithium fluoride is reacted with hydrogen fluoride (HF) and phosphorus pentachloride to make lithium hexafluorophosphate Li[PF_{6}], an ingredient in lithium ion battery electrolyte.

The lithium fluoride alone does not absorb hydrogen fluoride to form a bifluoride salt.

=== In molten salts ===
Fluorine is produced by the electrolysis of molten potassium bifluoride. This electrolysis proceeds more efficiently when the electrolyte contains a few percent of LiF, possibly because it facilitates formation of an Li-C-F interface on the carbon electrodes. A useful molten salt, FLiNaK, consists of a mixture of LiF, together with sodium fluoride and potassium fluoride. The primary coolant for the Molten-Salt Reactor Experiment was FLiBe; 2LiF·BeF_{2} (66 mol% of LiF, 33 mol% of BeF_{2}).

=== Optics ===
Because of the large band gap for LiF, its crystals are transparent to short wavelength ultraviolet radiation, more so than any other material. LiF is therefore used in specialized optics for the vacuum ultraviolet spectrum. (See also magnesium fluoride.) Lithium fluoride is used also as a diffracting crystal in X-ray spectrometry.

=== Radiation detectors ===
It is also used as a means to record ionizing radiation exposure from gamma rays, beta particles, and neutrons (indirectly, using the ^{6}_{3}Li (n,alpha) nuclear reaction) in thermoluminescent dosimeters. ^{6}LiF nanopowder enriched to 96% has been used as the neutron reactive backfill material for microstructured semiconductor neutron detectors (MSND).

=== Nuclear reactors ===
Lithium fluoride (highly enriched in the common isotope lithium-7) forms the basic constituent of the preferred fluoride salt mixture used in liquid-fluoride nuclear reactors. Typically lithium fluoride is mixed with beryllium fluoride to form a base solvent (FLiBe), into which fluorides of uranium and thorium are introduced. Lithium fluoride is exceptionally chemically stable and LiF/BeF_{2} mixtures (FLiBe) have low melting points (360 to 459 °C or 680 to 858 °F) and the best neutronic properties of fluoride salt combinations appropriate for reactor use. MSRE used two different mixtures in the two cooling circuits.

=== Cathode for PLED and OLEDs ===
Lithium fluoride is widely used in PLED and OLED as a coupling layer to enhance electron injection. The thickness of the LiF layer is usually around 1 nm. The dielectric constant (or relative permittivity, ε) of LiF is 9.0.

== Natural occurrence ==
Naturally occurring lithium fluoride is known as the extremely rare mineral griceite.
