= Pentafluoride =

Pentafluoride may refer to:

- Antimony pentafluoride, SbF_{5}
- Arsenic pentafluoride, AsF_{5}
- Bismuth pentafluoride, BiF_{5}
- Bromine pentafluoride, BrF_{5}
- Chlorine pentafluoride, ClF_{5}
- Chromium pentafluoride, CrF_{5}
- Gold pentafluoride, Au_{2}F_{10}
- Iodine pentafluoride, IF_{5}
- Iridium pentafluoride, IrF_{5}
- Manganese pentafluoride, MnF_{5} (predicted)
- Molybdenum pentafluoride, MoF_{5}
- Niobium pentafluoride, NbF_{5}
- Nitrogen pentafluoride, NF_{5} (hypothetical)
- Neptunium pentafluoride, NpF_{5}
- Osmium pentafluoride, OsF_{5}
- Phosphorus pentafluoride, PF_{5}
- Platinum pentafluoride, PtF_{5}
- Plutonium pentafluoride, PuF_{5}
- Protactinium pentafluoride, PaF_{5}
- Rhenium pentafluoride, ReF_{5}
- Rhodium pentafluoride, RhF_{5}
- Ruthenium pentafluoride, RuF_{5}
- Tantalum pentafluoride, TaF_{5}
- Technetium pentafluoride, TcF_{5}
- Tungsten pentafluoride, WF_{5}
- Uranium pentafluoride, UF_{5}
- Vanadium pentafluoride, VF_{5}
