= Difluorine complex =

A difluorine complex is a molecular coordination complex involving a difluorine (F_{2}) group as a ligand. The first example was gold heptafluoride (AuF_{7}). Instead of being a gold(VII) compound, with all five fluorine atoms equally bonded to the central gold atom, the structure is an adduct of gold(V) fluoride (AuF_{5}) and F_{2}. This conclusion has been repeatedly supported by calculations.

Although other diatomic element complexes exist, difluorine complexes have a different hapticity. Dinitrogen complexes of main-group elements and dihydrogen complex feature a "side-on" bonding of the hydrogen group with both hydrogen atoms participating in the coordinate bonding (η^{2}-H_{2}), whereas difluorine complexes feature "end-on" bonding with only one of the two fluorine atoms participating in the coordinate bonding (η^{1}-F_{2}).
