= Gold fluoride =

Gold fluoride may refer to:

- Gold(I) fluoride (gold monofluoride), AuF
- Gold(III) fluoride (gold trifluoride), AuF_{3}
- Gold(V) fluoride (gold pentafluoride), AuF_{5}
- Gold heptafluoride, AuF_{7} (AuF_{5}·F_{2})
