= Roentgenium =

Roentgenium, _{111}Rg
Roentgenium
- Pronunciation: /rʌntˈɡɛniəm/ (runt-GHEN-ee-əm); /rɛntˈɡɛniəm/ (rent-GHEN-ee-əm)
- Mass number: [282] (unconfirmed: 286)

Roentgenium in the periodic table
| Hydrogen | | | | | | | | | | | | | | | | | | | | | | | | | | | | | | | Helium |
| Lithium | Beryllium | | | | | | | | | | | | | | | | | | | | | | | | | Boron | Carbon | Nitrogen | Oxygen | Fluorine | Neon |
| Sodium | Magnesium | | | | | | | | | | | | | | | | | | | | | | | | | Aluminium | Silicon | Phosphorus | Sulfur | Chlorine | Argon |
| Potassium | Calcium | | | | | | | | | | | | | | | Scandium | Titanium | Vanadium | Chromium | Manganese | Iron | Cobalt | Nickel | Copper | Zinc | Gallium | Germanium | Arsenic | Selenium | Bromine | Krypton |
| Rubidium | Strontium | | | | | | | | | | | | | | | Yttrium | Zirconium | Niobium | Molybdenum | Technetium | Ruthenium | Rhodium | Palladium | Silver | Cadmium | Indium | Tin | Antimony | Tellurium | Iodine | Xenon |
| Caesium | Barium | Lanthanum | Cerium | Praseodymium | Neodymium | Promethium | Samarium | Europium | Gadolinium | Terbium | Dysprosium | Holmium | Erbium | Thulium | Ytterbium | Lutetium | Hafnium | Tantalum | Tungsten | Rhenium | Osmium | Iridium | Platinum | Gold | Mercury (element) | Thallium | Lead | Bismuth | Polonium | Astatine | Radon |
| Francium | Radium | Actinium | Thorium | Protactinium | Uranium | Neptunium | Plutonium | Americium | Curium | Berkelium | Californium | Einsteinium | Fermium | Mendelevium | Nobelium | Lawrencium | Rutherfordium | Dubnium | Seaborgium | Bohrium | Hassium | Meitnerium | Darmstadtium | Roentgenium | Copernicium | Nihonium | Flerovium | Moscovium | Livermorium | Tennessine | Oganesson |
Au
↑
Rg
↓
—
darmstadtium ← roentgenium → copernicium
- Atomic number (Z): 111
- Group: group 11
- Period: period 7
- Block: d-block
- Electron configuration: [Rn] 5f^{14} 6d^{9} 7s^{2} (predicted)
- Electrons per shell: 2, 8, 18, 32, 32, 17, 2 (predicted)

Physical properties
- Phase at STP: solid (predicted)
- Density (near r.t.): 22–24 g/cm^{3} (predicted)

Atomic properties
- Oxidation states: common: (none) (−1), (+3), (+5)
- Ionization energies: 1st: 1020 kJ/mol; 2nd: 2070 kJ/mol; 3rd: 3080 kJ/mol; (more) (all estimated)
- Atomic radius: empirical: 114 pm (predicted)
- Covalent radius: 121 pm (estimated)

Other properties
- Natural occurrence: synthetic
- Crystal structure: body-centered cubic (bcc) (predicted)
- CAS Number: 54386-24-2

History
- Naming: after Wilhelm Röntgen
- Discovery: Gesellschaft für Schwerionenforschung (1994)

Isotopes of roentgenium
| Main isotopes | | | Decay | |
| Isotope | abundance | half-life (t_{1/2}) | mode | product |
|---|---|---|---|---|
| ^{279}Rg | synth | 0.09 s | α87% | ^{275}Mt |
| ^{279}Rg | synth | 0.09 s | SF13% | – |
| ^{280}Rg | synth | 3.9 s | α | ^{276}Mt |
| ^{281}Rg | synth | 11 s | SF86% | – |
| ^{281}Rg | synth | 11 s | α14% | ^{277}Mt |
| ^{282}Rg | synth | 130 s | α | ^{278}Mt |
| ^{283}Rg | synth | 5.1 min? | SF | – |
| ^{286}Rg | synth | 10.7 min? | α | ^{282}Mt |

Roentgenium (German: [ʁœntˈɡeːni̯ʊm]) is a synthetic chemical element; it has symbol Rg and atomic number 111. It is extremely radioactive and can only be created in a laboratory. The most stable known isotope, roentgenium-282, has a half-life of 130 seconds, although the unconfirmed roentgenium-286 may have a longer half-life of about 10.7 minutes. Roentgenium was first created in December 1994 by the GSI Helmholtz Centre for Heavy Ion Research near Darmstadt, Germany. It is named after the physicist Wilhelm Röntgen (also spelled Roentgen), who discovered X-rays. Only a few roentgenium atoms have ever been synthesized, and they have no practical application.

In the periodic table, it is a d-block transactinide element. It is a member of the 7th period and is placed in the group 11 elements, although no chemical experiments have been carried out to confirm that it behaves as the heavier homologue to gold in group 11 as the ninth member of the 6d series of transition metals. Roentgenium is calculated to have similar properties to its lighter homologues, copper, silver, and gold, although it may show some differences from them.

== Introduction ==
=== Synthesis of superheavy nuclei ===
A graphic depiction of a nuclear fusion reaction. Two nuclei fuse into one, emitting a neutron. Reactions that created new elements to this moment were similar, though varying numbers of neutrons – or alternatively charged particles – may be emitted instead.

A superheavy (Note: In nuclear physics, an element is called heavy if its atomic number is high; lead (element 82) is one example of such a heavy element. The term "superheavy elements" typically refers to elements with atomic number greater than 103 (although there are other definitions, such as atomic number greater than 100 or 112; sometimes, the term is presented an equivalent to the term "transactinide", which puts an upper limit before the beginning of the hypothetical superactinide series). Terms "heavy isotopes" (of a given element) and "heavy nuclei" mean what could be understood in the common language—isotopes of high mass (for the given element) and nuclei of high mass, respectively.) atomic nucleus is created in a nuclear reaction that combines two other nuclei of unequal size (Note: In 2009, a team at the JINR led by Oganessian published results of their attempt to create hassium in a symmetric ^{136}Xe + ^{136}Xe reaction. They failed to observe a single atom in such a reaction, putting the upper limit on the cross section, the measure of probability of a nuclear reaction, as 2.5 pb. In comparison, the reaction that resulted in hassium discovery, ^{208}Pb + ^{58}Fe, had a cross section of ~20 pb (more specifically, 19^{+19}_{-11} pb), as estimated by the discoverers.) into one; roughly, the more unequal the two nuclei in terms of mass, the greater the possibility that the two react. The material made of the heavier nuclei is made into a target, which is then bombarded by the beam of lighter nuclei. Two nuclei can only fuse into one if they are close enough to each other; normally, nuclei (all positively charged) repel each other due to electrostatic repulsion. The strong interaction can overcome this repulsion but only within a very short distance from a nucleus; beam nuclei are thus greatly accelerated in order to make such repulsion insignificant compared to the velocity of the beam nucleus. The energy applied to the beam nuclei to accelerate them can cause them to reach speeds as high as one-tenth of the speed of light. However, if too much energy is applied, the beam nucleus can fall apart.

Coming close enough alone is not enough for two nuclei to fuse: when two nuclei approach each other, they usually remain together for about 10^{−20} seconds and then part ways (not necessarily in the same composition as before the reaction) rather than form a single nucleus. This happens because during the attempted formation of a single nucleus, electrostatic repulsion tears apart the nucleus that is being formed. Each pair of a target and a beam is characterized by its cross section—the probability that fusion will occur if two nuclei approach one another expressed in terms of the transverse area that the incident particle must hit in order for the fusion to occur. (Note: The amount of energy applied to the beam particle to accelerate it can also influence the value of cross section. For example, in the ^{28}_{14}Si + ^{1}_{0}n → ^{28}_{13}Al + ^{1}_{1}p reaction, cross section changes smoothly from 370 mb at 12.3 MeV to 160 mb at 18.3 MeV, with a broad peak at 13.5 MeV with the maximum value of 380 mb.) This fusion may occur as a result of the quantum effect in which nuclei can tunnel through electrostatic repulsion. If the two nuclei can stay close past that phase, multiple nuclear interactions result in redistribution of energy and an energy equilibrium.

External videos
- Visualization of unsuccessful nuclear fusion, based on calculations from the Australian National University

The resulting merger is an excited state—termed a compound nucleus—and thus it is very unstable. To reach a more stable state, the temporary merger may fission without formation of a more stable nucleus. Alternatively, the compound nucleus may eject a few neutrons, which would carry away the excitation energy; if the latter is not sufficient for a neutron expulsion, the merger would produce a gamma ray. This happens in about 10^{−16} seconds after the initial nuclear collision and results in creation of a more stable nucleus. The definition by the IUPAC/IUPAP Joint Working Party (JWP) states that a chemical element can only be recognized as discovered if a nucleus of it exists for at least 10^{−14} seconds. This value was chosen as an estimate of how long it takes a nucleus to acquire electrons and thus display its chemical properties. (Note: This figure also marks the generally accepted upper limit for lifetime of a compound nucleus.)

=== Decay and detection ===
The beam passes through the target and reaches the next chamber, the separator; if a new nucleus is produced, it is carried with this beam. In the separator, the newly produced nucleus is separated from other nuclides (that of the original beam and any other reaction products) (Note: This separation is based on that the resulting nuclei move past the target more slowly then the unreacted beam nuclei. The separator contains electric and magnetic fields whose effects on a moving particle cancel out for a specific velocity of a particle. Such separation can also be aided by a time-of-flight measurement and a recoil energy measurement; a combination of the two may allow to estimate the mass of a nucleus.) and transferred to a surface-barrier detector, which stops the nucleus. The exact location of the upcoming impact on the detector is marked; also marked are its energy and the time of the arrival. The transfer takes about 10^{−6} seconds; in order to be detected, the nucleus must survive this long. The nucleus is recorded again once its decay is registered, and the location, the energy, and the time of the decay are measured.

Stability of a nucleus is provided by the strong interaction. However, its range is very short; as nuclei become larger, its influence on the outermost nucleons (protons and neutrons) weakens. At the same time, the nucleus is torn apart by electrostatic repulsion between protons, and its range is not limited. Total binding energy provided by the strong interaction increases linearly with the number of nucleons, whereas electrostatic repulsion increases with the square of the atomic number, i.e. the latter grows faster and becomes increasingly important for heavy and superheavy nuclei. Superheavy nuclei are thus theoretically predicted and have so far been observed to predominantly decay via decay modes that are caused by such repulsion: alpha decay and spontaneous fission. (Note: Not all decay modes are caused by electrostatic repulsion. For example, beta decay is caused by the weak interaction.) Almost all alpha emitters have over 210 nucleons, and the lightest nuclide primarily undergoing spontaneous fission has 238. In both decay modes, nuclei are inhibited from decaying by corresponding energy barriers for each mode, but they can be tunneled through.

Scheme of an apparatus for creation of superheavy elements, based on the Dubna Gas-Filled Recoil Separator set up in the Flerov Laboratory of Nuclear Reactions in JINR. The trajectory within the detector and the beam focusing apparatus changes because of a dipole magnet in the former and quadrupole magnets in the latter.

Alpha particles are commonly produced in radioactive decays because the mass of an alpha particle per nucleon is small enough to leave some energy for the alpha particle to be used as kinetic energy to leave the nucleus. Spontaneous fission is caused by electrostatic repulsion tearing the nucleus apart and produces various nuclei in different instances of identical nuclei fissioning. As the atomic number increases, spontaneous fission rapidly becomes more important: spontaneous fission partial half-lives decrease by 23 orders of magnitude from uranium (element 92) to nobelium (element 102), and by 30 orders of magnitude from thorium (element 90) to fermium (element 100). The earlier liquid drop model thus suggested that spontaneous fission would occur nearly instantly due to disappearance of the fission barrier for nuclei with about 280 nucleons. The later nuclear shell model suggested that nuclei with about 300 nucleons would form an island of stability in which nuclei will be more resistant to spontaneous fission and will primarily undergo alpha decay with longer half-lives. Subsequent discoveries suggested that the predicted island might be further than originally anticipated; they also showed that nuclei intermediate between the long-lived actinides and the predicted island are deformed, and gain additional stability from shell effects. Experiments on lighter superheavy nuclei, as well as those closer to the expected island, have shown greater than previously anticipated stability against spontaneous fission, showing the importance of shell effects on nuclei. (Note: It was already known by the 1960s that ground states of nuclei differed in energy and shape as well as that certain magic numbers of nucleons corresponded to greater stability of a nucleus. However, it was assumed that there was no nuclear structure in superheavy nuclei as they were too deformed to form one.)

Alpha decays are registered by the emitted alpha particles, and the decay products are easy to determine before the actual decay; if such a decay or a series of consecutive decays produces a known nucleus, the original product of a reaction can be easily determined. (Note: Since mass of a nucleus is not measured directly but is rather calculated from that of another nucleus, such measurement is called indirect. Direct measurements are also possible, but for the most part they have remained unavailable for superheavy nuclei. The first direct measurement of mass of a superheavy nucleus was reported in 2018 at LBNL. Mass was determined from the location of a nucleus after the transfer (the location helps determine its trajectory, which is linked to the mass-to-charge ratio of the nucleus, since the transfer was done in presence of a magnet).) (That all decays within a decay chain were indeed related to each other is established by the location of these decays, which must be in the same place.) The known nucleus can be recognized by the specific characteristics of decay it undergoes such as decay energy (or more specifically, the kinetic energy of the emitted particle). (Note: If the decay occurred in a vacuum, then since total momentum of an isolated system before and after the decay must be preserved, the daughter nucleus would also receive a small velocity. The ratio of the two velocities, and accordingly the ratio of the kinetic energies, would thus be inverse to the ratio of the two masses. The decay energy equals the sum of the known kinetic energy of the alpha particle and that of the daughter nucleus (an exact fraction of the former). The calculations hold for an experiment as well, but the difference is that the nucleus does not move after the decay because it is tied to the detector.) Spontaneous fission, however, produces various nuclei as products, so the original nuclide cannot be determined from its daughters. (Note: Spontaneous fission was discovered by Soviet physicist Georgy Flerov, a leading scientist at JINR, and thus it was a "hobbyhorse" for the facility. In contrast, the LBL scientists believed fission information was not sufficient for a claim of synthesis of an element. They believed spontaneous fission had not been studied enough to use it for identification of a new element, since there was a difficulty of establishing that a compound nucleus had only ejected neutrons and not charged particles like protons or alpha particles. They thus preferred to link new isotopes to the already known ones by successive alpha decays.)

The information available to physicists aiming to synthesize a superheavy element is thus the information collected at the detectors: location, energy, and time of arrival of a particle to the detector, and those of its decay. The physicists analyze this data and seek to conclude that it was indeed caused by a new element and could not have been caused by a different nuclide than the one claimed. Often, provided data is insufficient for a conclusion that a new element was definitely created and there is no other explanation for the observed effects; errors in interpreting data have been made. (Note: For instance, element 102 was mistakenly identified in 1957 at the Nobel Institute of Physics in Stockholm, Stockholm County, Sweden. There were no earlier definitive claims of creation of this element, and the element was assigned a name by its Swedish, American, and British discoverers, nobelium. It was later shown that the identification was incorrect. The following year, RL was unable to reproduce the Swedish results and announced instead their synthesis of the element; that claim was also disproved later. JINR insisted that they were the first to create the element and suggested a name of their own for the new element, joliotium; the Soviet name was also not accepted (JINR later referred to the naming of the element 102 as "hasty"). This name was proposed to IUPAC in a written response to their ruling on priority of discovery claims of elements, signed 29 September 1992. The name "nobelium" remained unchanged on account of its widespread usage.)

== History ==
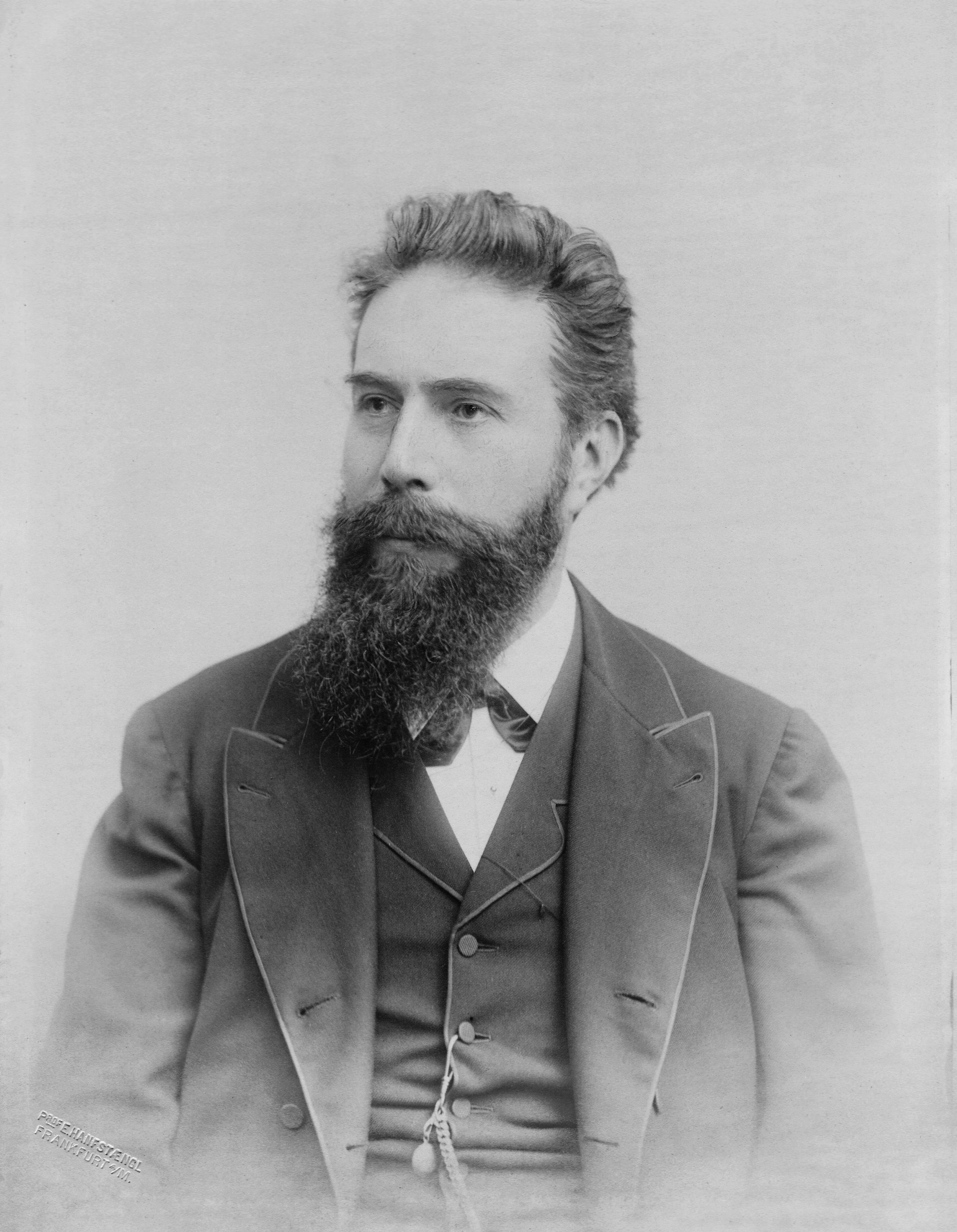
Roentgenium was named after the physicist Wilhelm Röntgen, the discoverer of X-rays.

=== Official discovery ===
Roentgenium was first synthesized by an international team led by Sigurd Hofmann at the Gesellschaft für Schwerionenforschung (GSI) in Darmstadt, Germany, on December 8, 1994. The team bombarded a target of bismuth-209 with accelerated nuclei of nickel-64 and detected three nuclei of the isotope ^{272}111:

^{209}_{83}Bi + ^{64}_{28}Ni → ^{272}111 + ^{1}_{0}n

This reaction had previously been conducted at the Joint Institute for Nuclear Research in Dubna (then in the Soviet Union) in 1986, but no atoms of ^{272}111 had then been observed. In 2001, the IUPAC/IUPAP Joint Working Party (JWP) concluded that there was insufficient evidence for the discovery at that time. The GSI team repeated their experiment in 2002 and detected three more atoms. In their 2003 report, the JWP decided that the GSI team should be acknowledged for the discovery of this element.

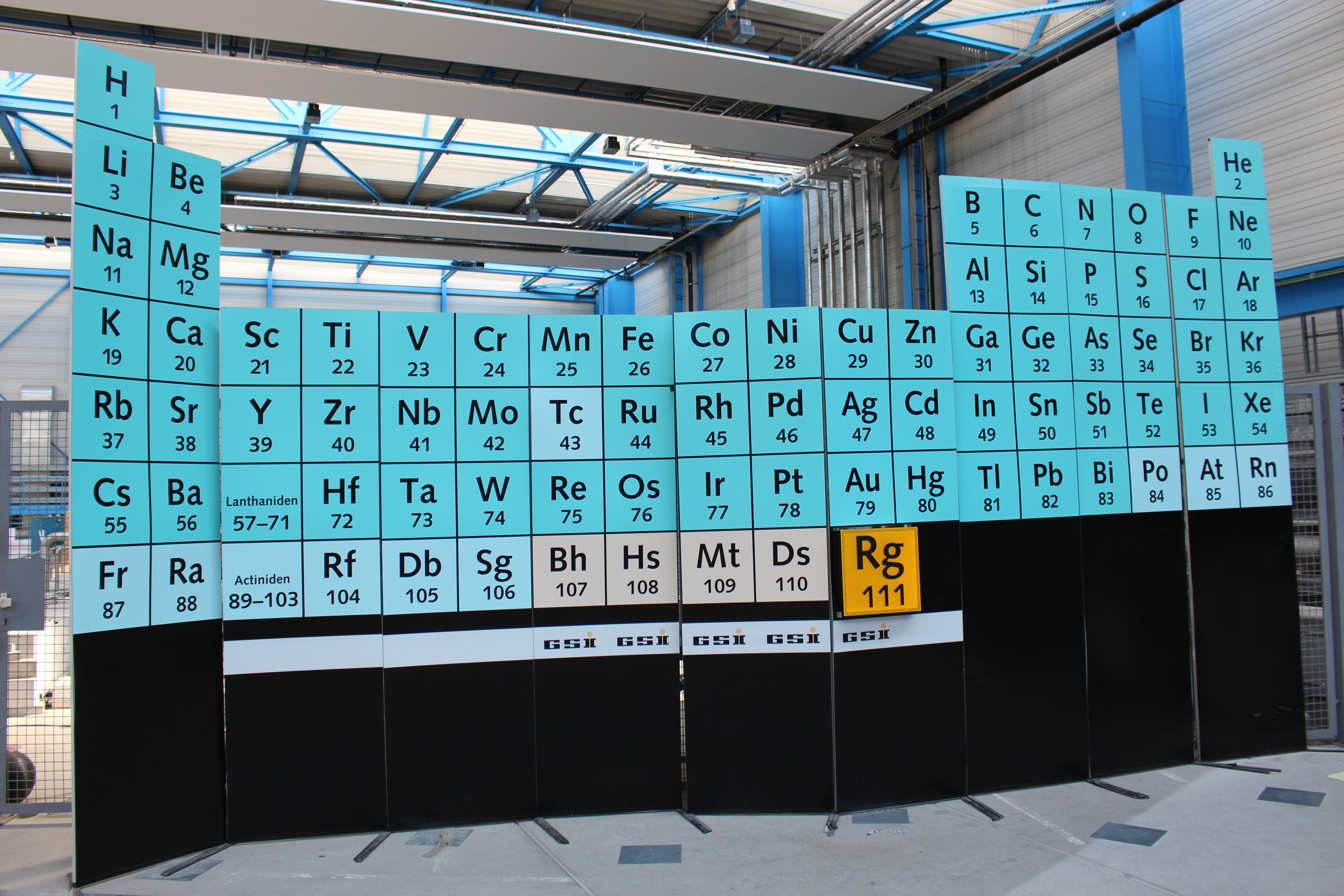
Backdrop for presentation of the discovery and recognition of roentgenium at GSI Darmstadt

=== Naming ===
Using Mendeleev's nomenclature for unnamed and undiscovered elements, roentgenium should be known as eka-gold. In 1979, IUPAC published recommendations according to which the element was to be called unununium (with the corresponding symbol of Uuu), a systematic element name as a placeholder, until the element was discovered (and the discovery then confirmed) and a permanent name was decided on. Although widely used in the chemical community on all levels, from chemistry classrooms to advanced textbooks, the recommendations were mostly ignored among scientists in the field, who called it element 111, with the symbol of E111, (111) or even simply 111.

The name roentgenium (Rg) was suggested by the GSI team in 2004, to honor the German physicist Wilhelm Conrad Röntgen, the discoverer of X-rays. This name was accepted by IUPAC on November 1, 2004.

== Isotopes ==
List of roentgenium isotopes
| Isotope | Half-life (Note: Different sources give different values for half-lives; the most recently published values are listed.) | | Decay mode | Discovery year | Discovery reaction |
| Isotope | Value | ref | Decay mode | Discovery year | Discovery reaction |
|---|---|---|---|---|---|
| ^{272}Rg | 4.2 ms | | α | 1995 | ^{209}Bi(^{64}Ni,n) |
| ^{274}Rg | 20 ms | | α | 2004 | ^{278}Nh(—,α) |
| ^{278}Rg | 4.6 ms | | α | 2007 | ^{282}Nh(—,α) |
| ^{279}Rg | 90 ms | | α, SF | 2004 | ^{287}Mc(—,2α) |
| ^{280}Rg | 3.9 s | | α, EC | 2004 | ^{288}Mc(—,2α) |
| ^{281}Rg | 11 s | | SF, α | 2010 | ^{293}Ts(—,3α) |
| ^{282}Rg | 130 s | | α | 2010 | ^{294}Ts(—,3α) |
| ^{283}Rg (Note: This isotope is unconfirmed) | 5.1 min | | SF | (2017) | ^{283}Cn(e^{−},ν_{e}) |
| ^{286}Rg | 10.7 min | | α | (2016) | ^{290}Fl(e^{−},ν_{e}α) |

Roentgenium has no stable or naturally occurring isotopes. Several radioactive isotopes have been synthesized in the laboratory, either by fusion of the nuclei of lighter elements or as intermediate decay products of heavier elements. Nine different isotopes of roentgenium have been reported with atomic masses 272, 274, 278–283, and 286 (283 and 286 unconfirmed), two of which, roentgenium-272 and roentgenium-274, have known but unconfirmed metastable states. All of these decay through alpha decay or spontaneous fission, though ^{280}Rg may also have an electron capture branch.

=== Stability and half-lives ===
All roentgenium isotopes are extremely unstable and radioactive; in general, the heavier isotopes are more stable than the lighter. The most stable known roentgenium isotope, ^{282}Rg, is also the heaviest known roentgenium isotope; it has a half-life of 100 seconds. The unconfirmed ^{286}Rg is even heavier and appears to have an even longer half-life of about 10.7 minutes, which would make it one of the longest-lived superheavy nuclides known; likewise, the unconfirmed ^{283}Rg appears to have a long half-life of about 5.1 minutes. The isotopes ^{280}Rg and ^{281}Rg have also been reported to have half-lives over a second. The remaining isotopes have half-lives in the millisecond range.

The missing isotopes between ^{274}Rg and ^{278}Rg are too light to be produced by hot fusion and too heavy to be produced by cold fusion. A possible synthesis method is to populate them from above, as daughters of nihonium or moscovium isotopes that can be produced by hot fusion. The isotopes ^{283}Rg and ^{284}Rg could be synthesised using charged-particle evaporation, using the ^{238}U+^{48}Ca reaction where a proton is evaporated alongside some neutrons.

== Predicted properties ==
Other than nuclear properties, no properties of roentgenium or its compounds have been measured; this is due to its extremely limited and expensive production and the fact that roentgenium (and its parents) decays very quickly. Properties of roentgenium metal remain unknown and only predictions are available.

=== Chemical ===
Roentgenium is the ninth member of the 6d series of transition metals. Calculations on its ionization potentials and atomic and ionic radii are similar to that of its lighter homologue gold, thus implying that roentgenium's basic properties will resemble those of the other group 11 elements, copper, silver, and gold; however, it is also predicted to show several differences from its lighter homologues.

Roentgenium is predicted to be a noble metal. The standard electrode potential of 1.9 V for the Rg^{3+}/Rg couple is greater than that of 1.5 V for the Au^{3+}/Au couple. Roentgenium's predicted first ionization energy of 1020 kJ/mol almost matches that of the noble gas radon at 1037 kJ/mol. Its predicted second ionization energy, 2070 kJ/mol, is almost the same as that of silver. Based on the most stable oxidation states of the lighter group 11 elements, roentgenium is predicted to show stable +5 and +3 oxidation states, with a less stable +1 state. The +3 state is predicted to be the most stable. Roentgenium(III) is expected to be of comparable reactivity to gold(III), but should be more stable and form a larger variety of compounds. Gold also forms a somewhat stable −1 state due to relativistic effects, and it has been suggested roentgenium may do so as well: nevertheless, the electron affinity of roentgenium is expected to be around 1.6 eV (150 kJ/mol), significantly lower than gold's value of 2.3 eV (220 kJ/mol), so roentgenides may not be stable or even possible.

Diagram of a roentgenium atom with electron shells.

The 6d orbitals are destabilized by relativistic effects and spin–orbit interactions near the end of the fourth transition metal series, thus making the high oxidation state roentgenium(V) more stable than its lighter homologue gold(V) (known only in gold pentafluoride, Au_{2}F_{10}) as the 6d electrons participate in bonding to a greater extent. The spin-orbit interactions stabilize molecular roentgenium compounds with more bonding 6d electrons; for example, RgF^{−}_{6} is expected to be more stable than RgF^{−}_{4}, which is expected to be more stable than RgF^{−}_{2}. The stability of RgF^{−}_{6} is homologous to that of AuF^{−}_{6}; the silver analogue AgF^{−}_{6} is unknown and is expected to be only marginally stable to decomposition to AgF^{−}_{4} and F_{2}. Moreover, Rg_{2}F_{10} is expected to be stable to decomposition, exactly analogous to the Au_{2}F_{10}, whereas Ag_{2}F_{10} should be unstable to decomposition to Ag_{2}F_{6} and F_{2}. Gold heptafluoride, AuF_{7}, is known as a gold(V) difluorine complex AuF_{5}·F_{2}, which is lower in energy than a true gold(VII) heptafluoride would be; RgF_{7} is instead calculated to be more stable as a true roentgenium(VII) heptafluoride, although it would be somewhat unstable, its decomposition to Rg_{2}F_{10} and F_{2} releasing a small amount of energy at room temperature. Roentgenium(I) is expected to be difficult to obtain. Gold readily forms the cyanide complex Au(CN)^{−}_{2}, which is used in its extraction from ore through the process of gold cyanidation; roentgenium is expected to follow suit and form Rg(CN)^{−}_{2}.

The probable chemistry of roentgenium has received more interest than that of the two previous elements, meitnerium and darmstadtium, as the valence s-subshells of the group 11 elements are expected to be relativistically contracted most strongly at roentgenium. Calculations on the molecular compound RgH show that relativistic effects double the strength of the roentgenium–hydrogen bond, even though spin–orbit interactions also weaken it by 0.7 eV (68 kJ/mol). The compounds AuX and RgX, where X = F, Cl, Br, O, Au, or Rg, were also studied. Rg^{+} is predicted to be the softest metal ion, even softer than Au^{+}, although there is disagreement on whether it would behave as an acid or a base. In aqueous solution, Rg^{+} would form the aqua ion [Rg(H_{2}O)_{2}]^{+}, with an Rg–O bond distance of 207.1 pm. It is also expected to form Rg(I) complexes with ammonia, phosphine, and hydrogen sulfide.

=== Physical and atomic ===
Roentgenium is expected to be a solid under normal conditions and to crystallize in the body-centered cubic structure, unlike its lighter congeners which crystallize in the face-centered cubic structure, due to its being expected to have different electron charge densities from them. It should be a very heavy metal with a density of around 22–24 g/cm^{3}; in comparison, the densest known element that has had its density measured, osmium, has a density of 22.61 g/cm^{3}. The atomic radius of roentgenium is expected to be around 114 pm.

== Experimental chemistry ==
Unambiguous determination of the chemical characteristics of roentgenium has yet to have been established due to the low yields of reactions that produce roentgenium isotopes. For chemical studies to be carried out on a transactinide, at least four atoms must be produced, the half-life of the isotope used must be at least 1 second, and the rate of production must be at least one atom per week. Even though the half-life of ^{282}Rg, the most stable confirmed roentgenium isotope, is 100 seconds, long enough to perform chemical studies, another obstacle is the need to increase the rate of production of roentgenium isotopes and allow experiments to carry on for weeks or months so that statistically significant results can be obtained. Separation and detection must be carried out continuously to separate out the roentgenium isotopes and allow automated systems to experiment on the gas-phase and solution chemistry of roentgenium, as the yields for heavier elements are predicted to be smaller than those for lighter elements. However, the experimental chemistry of roentgenium has not received as much attention as that of the heavier elements from copernicium to livermorium, despite early interest in theoretical predictions due to relativistic effects on the ns subshell in group 11 reaching a maximum at roentgenium. The isotopes ^{280}Rg and ^{281}Rg are promising for chemical experimentation and may be produced as the granddaughters of the moscovium isotopes ^{288}Mc and ^{289}Mc respectively; their parents are the nihonium isotopes ^{284}Nh and ^{285}Nh, which have already received preliminary chemical investigations.

== See also ==
- Island of stability

== General bibliography ==
- Audi, G.; Kondev, F. G.; Wang, M.; et al. (2017). "The NUBASE2016 evaluation of nuclear properties". Chinese Physics C. 41 (3) 030001. Bibcode:2017ChPhC..41c0001A. doi:10.1088/1674-1137/41/3/030001.
- Beiser, A. (2003). Concepts of modern physics (6th ed.). McGraw-Hill. ISBN 978-0-07-244848-1. OCLC 48965418.
- Hoffman, D. C.; Ghiorso, A.; Seaborg, G. T. (2000). The Transuranium People: The Inside Story. World Scientific. ISBN 978-1-78-326244-1.
- Kragh, H. (2018). From Transuranic to Superheavy Elements: A Story of Dispute and Creation. Springer. ISBN 978-3-319-75813-8.
- Zagrebaev, V.; Karpov, A.; Greiner, W. (2013). "Future of superheavy element research: Which nuclei could be synthesized within the next few years?". Journal of Physics: Conference Series. 420 (1) 012001. arXiv:1207.5700. Bibcode:2013JPhCS.420a2001Z. doi:10.1088/1742-6596/420/1/012001. ISSN 1742-6588. S2CID 55434734.
