= Dihydrogen complex =

Containing intact H2 as a ligand

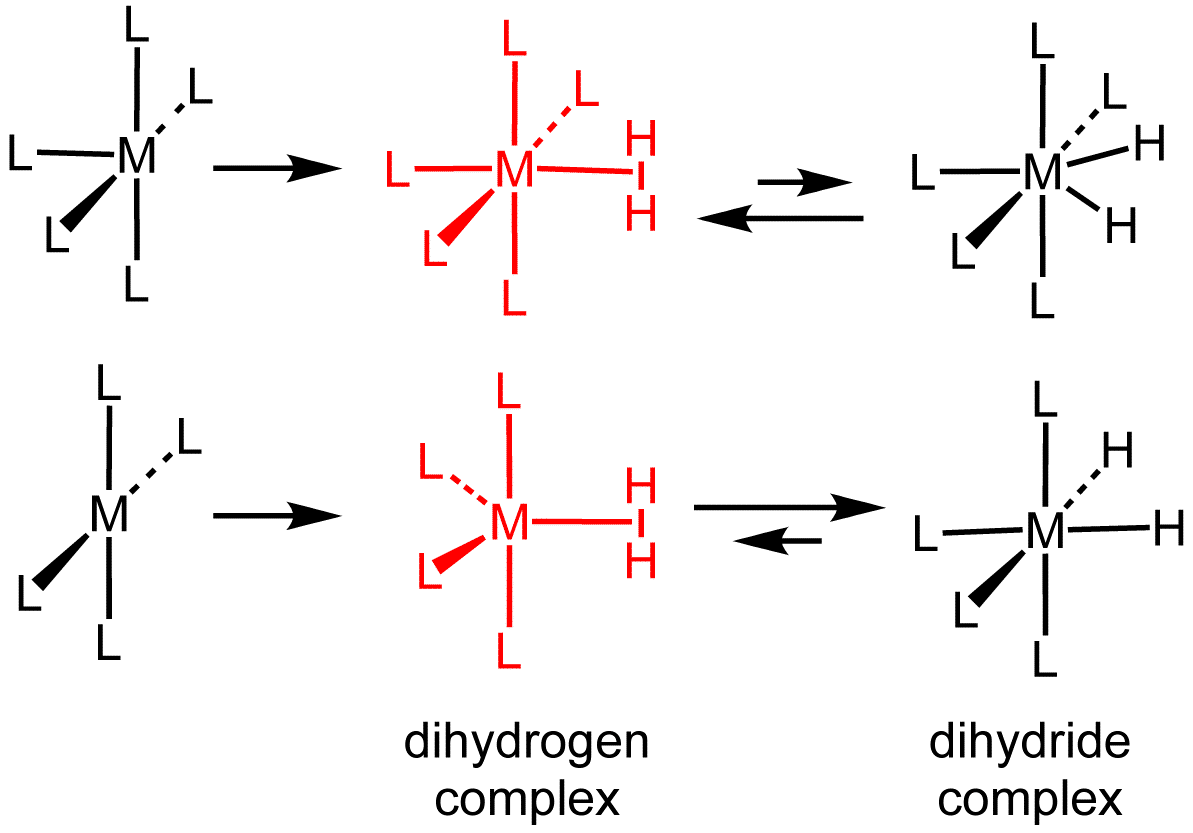
Formation and equilibrium structures of metal dihydrogen and dihydride complexes (L = ligand)

Dihydrogen complexes are coordination complexes containing intact H_{2} as a ligand. They are a subset of sigma complexes. The prototypical complex is W(CO)_{3}(PCy_{3})_{2}(H_{2}). This class of compounds represent intermediates in metal-catalyzed reactions involving hydrogen. Hundreds of dihydrogen complexes have been reported. Most examples are cationic transition metals complexes with octahedral geometry.

Upon complexation, the H−H bond is extended to 0.81–0.82 Å as indicated by neutron diffraction, about a 10% extension relative to the H−H bond in free H_{2}. Some complexes containing multiple hydrogen ligands, i.e. polyhydrides, also exhibit short H−H contacts. It has been suggested that distances < 1.00 Å indicates significant dihydrogen character, where separations > 1 Å are better described as dihydride complexes (see figure).

== Characterization ==
An often studied dihydrogen complex of iron, [HFe(H_{2})(dppe)_{2}]^{+}.

The usual method for characterization is ^{1}H NMR spectroscopy. The magnitude of spin–spin coupling, J_{HD}, is a useful indicator of the strength of the bond between the hydrogen and deuterium in HD complexes. For example, J_{HD} is 43.2 Hz in HD but 33.5 Hz in W(HD)(CO)_{3}(P^{i}Pr_{3})_{2}. Dihydrogen complexes typically have shorter ^{1}H-spin-lattice relaxation times than the corresponding dihydrides.

An ideal if nontrivial method of characterization of dihydrogen complexes is neutron diffraction. Neutrons interact strongly with hydrogen atoms, which allows one to infer their location in a crystal. In some cases, hydrogen ligands are usefully characterized by X-ray crystallography, but often the presence of metals, which strongly scatter X-rays, complicates the analysis.

The triangular MH_{2} subunit has six normal modes of vibration, one of which is mainly of ν_{H−H} character. In free H_{2}, this very strong bond absorbs at 4300 cm^{−1}, whereas in dihydrogen complexes the frequency drops to around 2800 cm^{−1}.

== Synthesis ==
Two preparation methods involve the direct reactions with H_{2} gas. The first entails the addition of H_{2} to an unsaturated metal center, as originally reported for W(CO)_{3}(P-i-Pr_{3})_{2}(H_{2}). In such cases, the unsaturated complex in fact features an agostic interaction that is displaced by the H_{2}.

In other cases, H_{2} will displace anionic ligands, sometimes even halides. Treatment of chlorobis(dppe)iron hydride with sodium tetrafluorborate under an atmosphere of hydrogen is one example:

HFeCl(dppe)_{2} + NaBF_{4} + H_{2} → [HFe(H_{2})(dppe)_{2}][BF_{4}] + NaCl

Many metal hydrides can be protonated to give dihydrogen complexes:

H_{2}Fe(dppe)_{2} + H^{+} → [HFe(H_{2})(dppe)_{2}]^{+}

In such cases, the acid usually is derived from a weakly coordinating anion, e.g., Brookhart's acid.

== History ==
In 1984, Kubas et al. discovered that the addition of H_{2} to the purple-colored species M(CO)_{3}(PR_{3})_{2} gave a yellow precipitate of mer-trans-M(CO)_{3}(PR_{3})_{2}(H_{2}) (M = Mo or W; R = cyclohexyl, iso-propyl). This result rapidly led to the discovery of a variety of related complexes such as Cr(H_{2})(CO)_{5} and [Fe(H_{2})(H)(dppe)_{2}]^{+}. Kubas et al.'s findings also led to a reevaluation of previously described compounds. For example, the complex "RuH_{4}(PPh_{3})_{3}" described in 1968 was reformulated as a dihydrogen complex.

== See also ==
- Difluorine complex
