= Chlorobis(dppe)iron hydride =

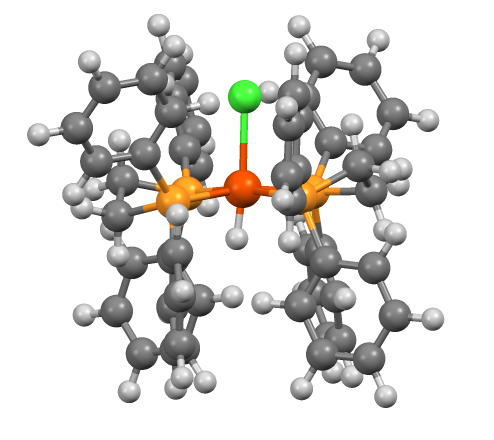

Names
- IUPAC name Chlorohydridobis(bis-1,2-(diphenylphosphino)ethane)iron(II)

Identifiers
| CAS Number | 32490-70-3 |
| 3D model (JSmol) | Interactive image |
| PubChem CID | 165365653 |
| CompTox Dashboard (EPA) | DTXSID001045863 |
- InChI: InChI=1S/2C26H24P2.ClH.Fe.H/c2*1-5-13-23(14-6-1)27(24-15-7-2-8-16-24)21-22-28(25-17-9-3-10-18-25)26-19-11-4-12-20-26;;;/h2*1-20H,21-22H2;1H;;/q;;;+1;/p-1 Key: NSXBDVRBULAONI-UHFFFAOYSA-M
- SMILES: Cl[FeH-4]56([P+](c1ccccc1)(c2ccccc2)CC[P+]5(c3ccccc3)c4ccccc4)[P+](c1ccccc1)(c2ccccc2)CC[P+]6(c3ccccc3)c4ccccc4

Properties
| Chemical formula | C_{52}H_{49}ClFeP_{4} |
| Molar mass | 889.09 |
| Appearance | red-violet solid |
| Melting point | 195 °C (383 °F; 468 K) |
- Except where otherwise noted, data are given for materials in their standard state (at 25 °C [77 °F], 100 kPa). Infobox references

Chlorobis(dppe)iron hydride is a coordination complex with the formula HFeCl(dppe)_{2}, where dppe is the bidentate ligand 1,2-bis(diphenylphosphino)ethane. It is a red-violet solid. The compound has attracted much attention as a precursor to dihydrogen complexes.

== Structure ==
The complex exhibits octahedral molecular geometry. The chloride and hydride ligands are mutually trans. The bond distances between the iron metal atom and the coordinating ligands are given by the following:

| Bond | Bond distance |
| Fe-P_{1} | 2.238 |
| Fe-P_{2} | 2.256 |
| Fe-P_{3} | 2.236 |
| Fe-P_{4} | 2.255 |
| Fe-Cl | 2.404 |
| Fe-H | 1.313 |

== Synthesis and reactions ==
The compound is synthesized according to the following idealized reaction:

FeCl_{2} + 2 dppe + Na[BH_{4}] → NaCl + ½ B_{2}H_{6} + HFeCl(dppe)_{2}

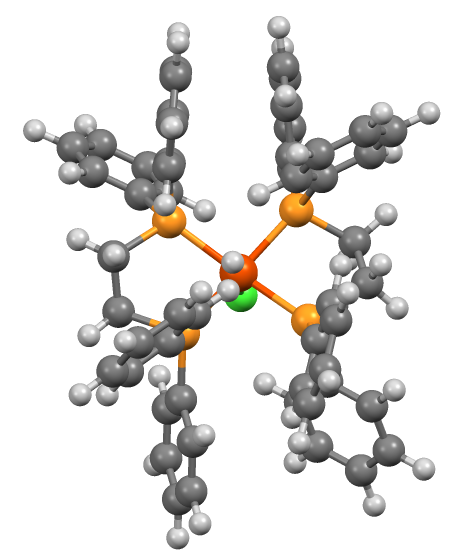
"Top-view" of the structure of HFeCl(dppe)_{2}

In the course of this conversion, high-spin complex FeCl_{2}(dppe)_{2} converts to low-spin HFeCl(dppe)_{2}.

The complex HFeCl[(dppe)_{2} exhibits a number of reactions associated with the remaining Fe-Cl bond. Reaction of the complex with sodium borohydride gives the dihydride complex:

HFeCl(dppe)_{2} + NaBH_{4} → H_{2}Fe(dppe)_{2} + NaCl + "BH_{3}"

Removal of chloride using sodium tetrafluorborate under and atmostphere of hydrogen or nitrogen gives the dinitrogen and dihydrogen complexes:

HFeCl(dppe)_{2} + NaBF_{4} + N_{2} → [HFe(N_{2})(dppe)_{2}]BF_{4} + NaCl
HFeCl(dppe)_{2} + NaBF_{4} + H_{2} → [HFe(H_{2})(dppe)_{2}]BF_{4} + NaCl
