= Gold(V) fluoride =

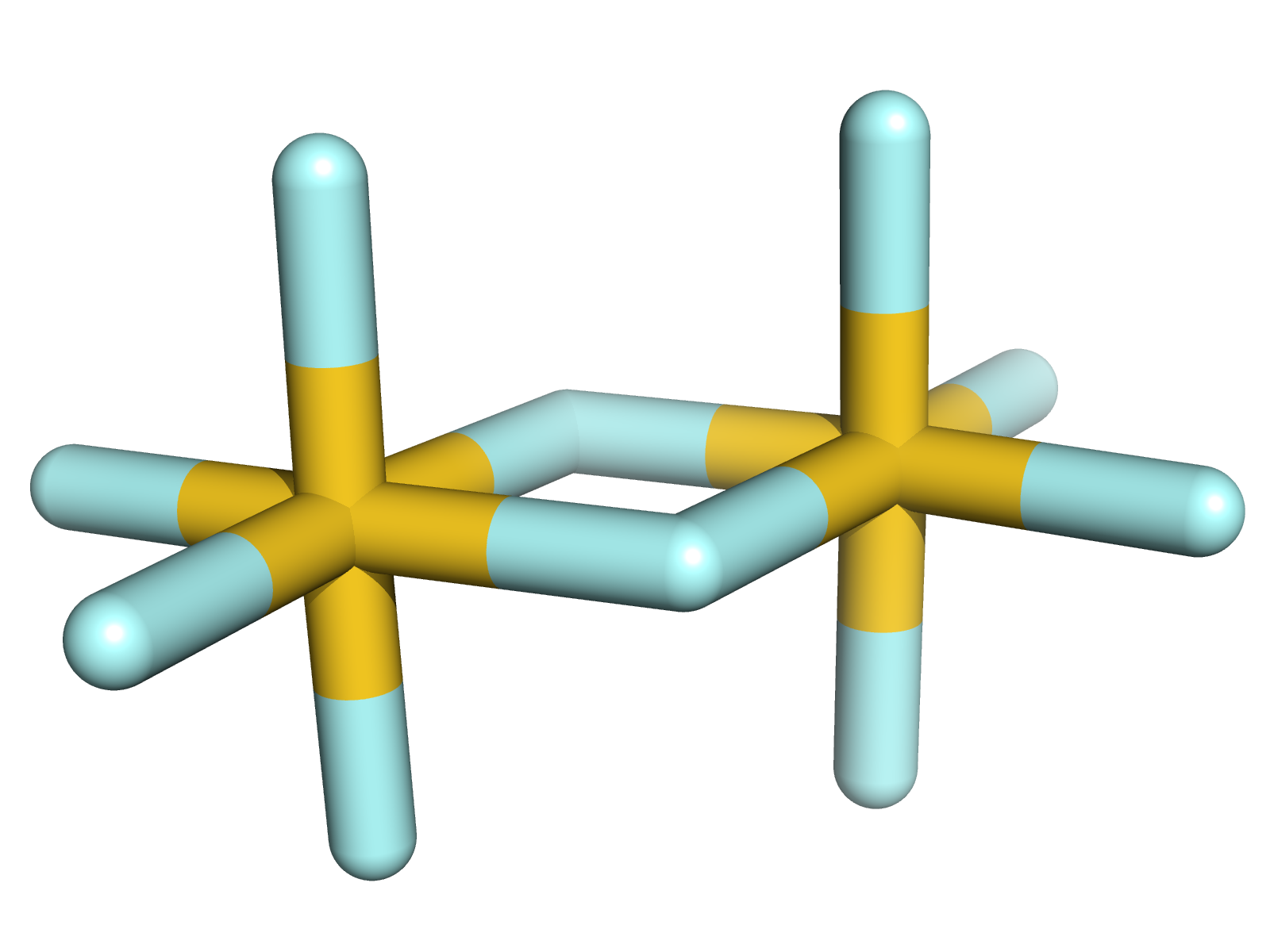
- Gold(V) fluoride

Names
- IUPAC name Gold(V) fluoride
- Other names Gold pentafluoride Perauric fluoride

Identifiers
CAS Number	57542-85-5
3D model (JSmol)	Interactive image
ChEBI	CHEBI:30080
Gmelin Reference	1124345
PubChem CID	139033578
CompTox Dashboard (EPA)	DTXSID101045547
- InChI: InChI=1S/Au.5FH/h;5*1H/q+5;;;;;/p-5 Key: QLYSAMSIXPXFDZ-UHFFFAOYSA-I
- SMILES: F[Au](F)(F)(F)F

Properties
Chemical formula	Au_{2}F_{10}
Molar mass	291.959 g/mol
Appearance	red unstable solid
Melting point	60 °C (140 °F; 333 K) (decomposes)
Solubility in water	Decomposes

Structure
Crystal structure	orthorhombic (Pnma)

Hazards
- Occupational safety and health (OHS/OSH)
Main hazards	Corrosive, toxic

Related compounds
Other cations	SbF_{5}, BrF_{5}, IF_{5}
Related compounds	AuF_{3}, AuF_{7}
- Except where otherwise noted, data are given for materials in their standard state (at 25 °C [77 °F], 100 kPa). verify (what is ?) Infobox references

Gold(V) fluoride is the inorganic compound with the formula Au_{2}F_{10}. This fluoride compound features gold in its highest known oxidation state. This red solid dissolves in hydrogen fluoride but these solutions decompose, liberating fluorine.

The structure of gold(V) fluoride in the solid state is centrosymmetric with hexacoordinated gold and an octahedral arrangement of the fluoride centers on each gold center. It is the only known dimeric pentafluoride, although sulfur can form disulfur decafluoride; other pentafluorides are monomeric (P, As, Sb, Cl, Br, I), tetrameric (Nb, Ta, Cr, Mo, W, Tc, Re, Ru, Os, Rh, Ir, Pt), or polymeric (Bi, V, U). In the gas phase, a mixture of dimer and trimer in the ratio 82:18 has been observed.

Gold pentafluoride is the strongest known fluoride ion acceptor, exceeding the acceptor tendency of even antimony pentafluoride; and is also the strongest known Lewis acid.

== Synthesis ==
Gold(V) fluoride can be synthesized by heating gold metal in an atmosphere of oxygen and fluorine to 370 °C at 8 atmospheres to form dioxygenyl hexafluoroaurate:

Au(s) + O_{2}(g) + 3 F_{2}(g) → O_{2}AuF_{6}(s)

This salt decomposes at 180 °C to produce the pentafluoride:

2 O_{2}AuF_{6}(s) → Au_{2}F_{10} (s) + 2 O_{2}(g) + F_{2}(g)

Krypton difluoride can also oxidise gold to the +5 oxidation state:

7 KrF_{2} (g) + 2 Au (s) → 2 KrF^{+}AuF^{−}_{6} (s) + 5 Kr (g)

KrF^{+}AuF^{−}_{6} decomposes at 60 °C into gold(V) fluoride and gaseous krypton and fluorine:

2 KrF^{+}AuF^{−}_{6} → Au_{2}F_{10} (s) + 2 Kr (g) + 2 F_{2} (g)
