= Rhodium pentafluoride =

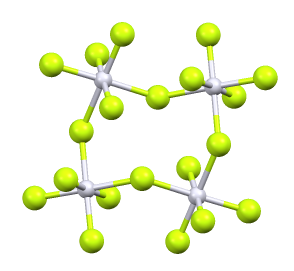

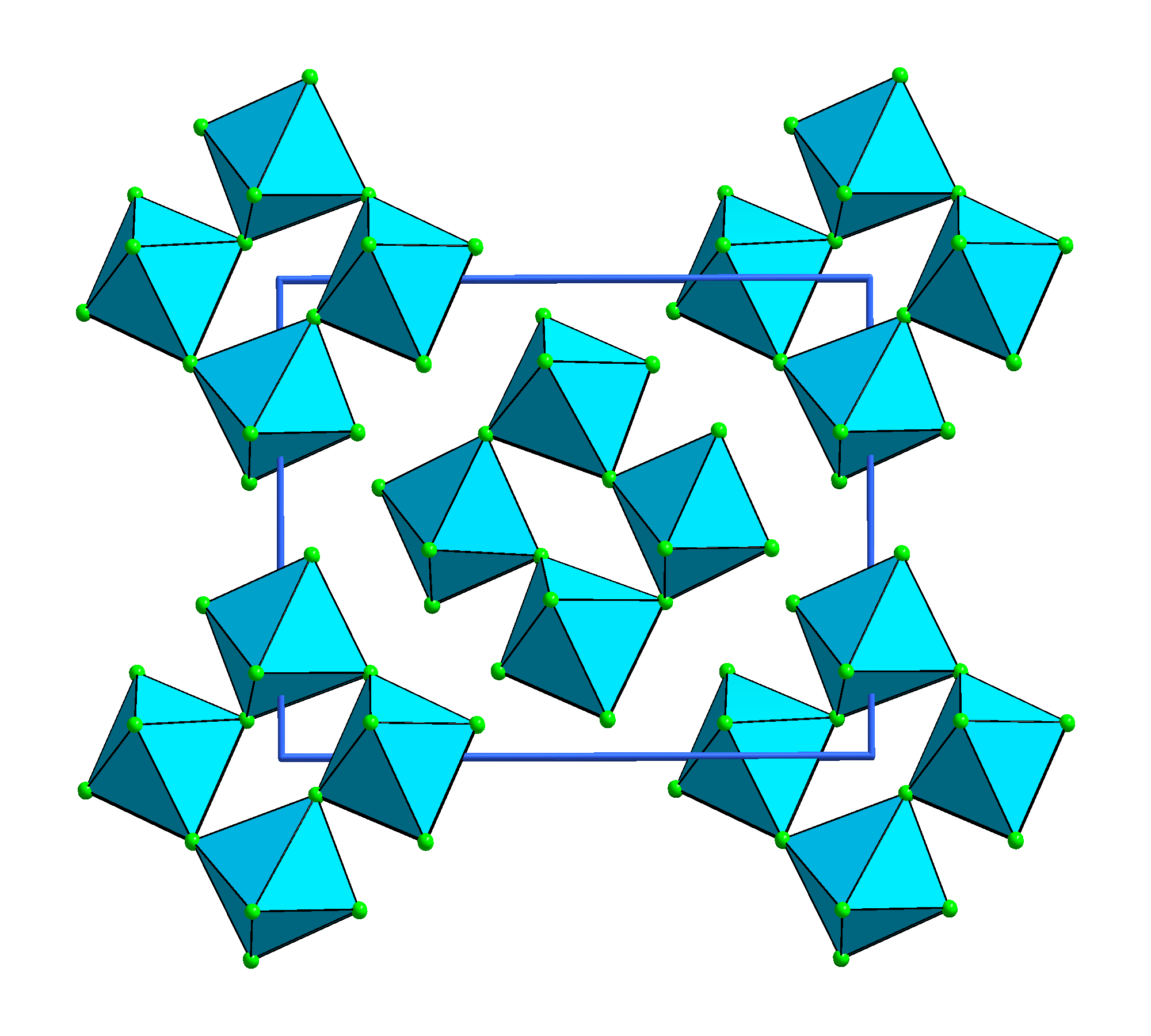

Names
- IUPAC name Rhodium(V) fluoride

Identifiers
CAS Number	41517-05-9
3D model (JSmol)	monomer: Interactive image; tetramer: Interactive image
PubChem CID	129730862
- InChI: InChI=1S/5FH.Rh/h5*1H;/q;;;;;+5/p-5 Key: AUMCJABXDMCEGV-UHFFFAOYSA-I
- SMILES: monomer: F[Rh](F)(F)(F)F; tetramer: F[Rh-]1(F)(F)(F)[F+][Rh-](F)(F)(F)(F)[F+][Rh-](F)(F)(F)(F)[F+][Rh-](F)(F)(F)(F)[F+]1

Properties
Chemical formula	F_{5}Rh
Molar mass	197.89751 g·mol^{−1}
Appearance	Red solid
Density	3.95 g cm^{3}

Structure
Crystal structure	Monoclinic
Space group	P2_{1}/a
Lattice constant	a = 12.338, b = 9.9173, c = 5.5173 α = 90°, β = 100.42°, γ = 90°
Lattice volume (V)	663.85
Formula units (Z)	8
- Except where otherwise noted, data are given for materials in their standard state (at 25 °C [77 °F], 100 kPa). Infobox references

Rhodium pentafluoride is an inorganic compound with the formula Rh_{4}F_{20}. It is a red solid. It is prepared by fluorination of rhodium trifluoride at 400 °C.

According to X-ray crystallography, the Rh centers are octahedral. The structure is very similar to that of the related ruthenium pentafluoride, osmium pentafluoride, and iridium pentafluoride. All are tetrameric, meaning that they have the molecular structure [MF_{5}]_{4}. The M-F distances for the bridging fluoride ligands are typically about 0.2 Å longer than the Rh-F distances for the nonbridging fluoride ligands. In the case of rhodium pentafluoride, these distances average 1.999(4) and 1.808(8) Å. The Rh-F-Rh angles average 135°, which leads to a ruffled structure. In contrast, the M-F-M centers are linear in the pentafluorides of niobium, tantalum, molybdenum, and tungsten.
