= Technetium(V) fluoride =

Names
- Other names Technetium(V) fluoride

Identifiers
CAS Number	31052-14-9
3D model (JSmol)	Interactive image
PubChem CID	149433740
- InChI: InChI=1S/5FH.Tc/h5*1H;/q;;;;;+5/p-5 Key: OSZPGOCLYCKXRN-UHFFFAOYSA-I
- SMILES: F[Tc](F)(F)(F)F

Properties
Chemical formula	F_{5}Tc
Molar mass	193 g·mol^{−1}
Appearance	yellow crystals
Melting point	50 °C (122 °F; 323 K)
Solubility in water	reacts with water

Structure
Crystal structure	orthorhombic

Related compounds
Related compounds	Rhenium pentafluoride
- Except where otherwise noted, data are given for materials in their standard state (at 25 °C [77 °F], 100 kPa). Infobox references

Technetium pentafluoride is a binary inorganic chemical compound of technetium metal and fluorine with the chemical formula TcF_{5}.

== Synthesis ==
The compound can be synthesised by heating of technetium powder in a jet of fluorine diluted with nitrogen:

2Tc + 5F_{2} → 2TcF_{5}

Another way to prepare it is the effect of iodine on technetium hexafluoride solution in iodine pentafluoride:

2TcF_{6} + I_{2} → 2TcF_{5} + 2IF

== Physical properties ==
Technetium pentafluoride forms yellow crystals of the orthorhombic crystal system. It reacts with water, and is volatile.

== Chemical properties ==
The compound is hydrolyzed by water, disproportionating to more stable technetium compounds:

3TcF_{5} + 8H_{2}O → HTcO_{4} + 2TcO_{2} + 15HF
