= Dinitrogen complexes of main-group elements =

While the first dinitrogen complex was discovered in 1965, reports of dinitrogen complexes of main group elements have been significantly limited relative to their transition metal complex analogues. Examples span both the s- and p- blocks, with particular breakthroughs in Groups 1, 2, 13, 14, and 15 in the periodic table. These complexes tend to involve somewhat weak interactions between N_{2} and the main group atoms it binds. The formation of such compounds is of interest to chemists who seek to extend transition metal reactivity into the main group elements and especially those interested in using main group-mediated N_{2} activation.

== Examples ==
One quintessential dinitrogen complex of a main group element is Gernot Frenking’s triphenylphosphinazine, first reported in 2013 in Angewandte Communications. This compound was notable for demonstrating the double Lewis acid behavior of dinitrogen, as the publication describes the N_{2} moiety in the doubly excited ^{1}Γ_{g} state with four lone pairs on N—N fragment. The authors concluded that this electronic configuration renders dinitrogen a very strong Lewis acid given its electronic sextet as well as its relative electronegativity. Thus, the Lewis acidity of the N_{2} fragment strengthens Ph_{3}P→N_{2}←PPh_{3} attraction, making triphenylphosphinazine kinetically stable despite its thermodynamic instability. Indeed, Frenking et al. calculated the energy for the dissociation of N_{2}(PPh_{3})_{2} to N_{2}+2 PPh_{3} at RI-BP86/def2-TZVPP and found, with corrections for thermal and entropic contributions, a Gibbs free energy of −74.5 kcal mol^{−1}. Meanwhile, Wilson et al.’s MP2/TZVP//B3LYP/TZVP value was slightly larger in magnitude at −87.8 kcal mol^{−1}, but in either computation method, triphenylphosphinazine is thermodynamically unstable, with a strongly exergonic dissociation reaction. Thus, the kinetic contributions of the electronic structure of this compound are striking. Its isolation demonstrates that compounds whose dissociations would otherwise be strongly exergonic become isolable provided sufficient stabilization of their electronic structures. In other words, very strong donor-acceptor interactions may be sufficiently stabilizing to enable the isolation of compounds with very large heats of formation. The authors of this paper performed an EDA-NOCV analysis (Energy Decomposition Analysis-Natural Orbitals for Chemical Valence) to gain further information on the electrostatic interactions in this complex and found that, coupled with NBO analysis, this technique revealed that the P-N bonding in triphenylphosphinazine is more a function of P → N σ donation than it is N → P π back-donation. As such, the authors proposed a representation of this molecule consisting of dative P-N bonding. This is consistent with the partial charge of -1.73 on the N_{2} fragment calculated by NBO analysis, which also identified two lone pairs at each N atom and a single bond between the N atoms, supporting the Ph_{3}P→N←PPh_{3} representation.

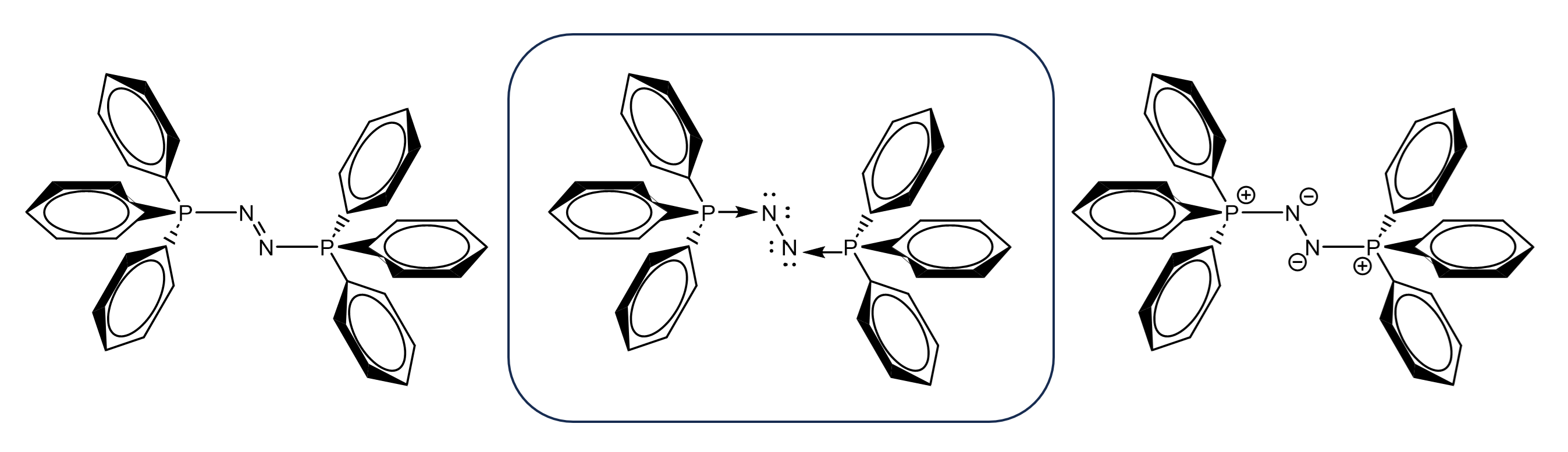
Three representations of Gernot Frenking's triphenylphosphinazine complex. Frenking et al.'s preferred representation is identified in the boxed figure.

=== p-block ===
Complexes of dinitrogen in the p-block tend to be rather weakly coordinated. One such notable example in the realm of dinitrogen complexes of main group elements are those formed with main group radicals. In 2011, it was reported that paramagnetic main group compounds can form complexes with dinitrogen; the Sn(Hyp)_{3} radical (where Hyp = Si(SiMe_{3})_{3}) was found to form a complex with weak van der Waals interactions with N_{2} detectable via electron paramagnetic resonance (EPR) and hyperfine sublevel correlation spectroscopy (HYSCORE). The van der Waals complex features transfer of unpaired electron spin density from Sn to N_{2} and is among the first examples of a dinitrogen complex to a large radical species in solution.

Another useful example of a dinitrogen complex to a p-block main group element is Ga-N_{2}. Himmel et al. used matrix isolation experiments to spectroscopically probe the interactions between Ga and N_{2} in this species. The authors found that the bond between Ga and N relies on donation from the filled p orbital on the N atom into the empty p orbital on Ga; this was consistent with indications in the UV/Vis and Raman spectra that the complex's ^{2}S excited state features a stronger Ga-N_{2} bond than its ^{2}P ground state, as the excited state has a stronger σ interaction due to the removal of the unpaired electron from the p orbital. Spectroscopic data also allowed the authors to calculate a bond energy of 79 kJ mol^{−1} for the Ga-N_{2} complex. In terms of Group 13 dinitrogen complexes more generally, Himmel et al. found that the interactions between Group 13 metals and N_{2} are likely to be weak, as various experiments have demonstrated that N_{2} dissociates from the adduct at high temperatures. Interestingly, variations in pressure at constant temperature do not impact the decomposition rate with respect to N_{2}.

=== s-block ===
Dinitrogen complexes have also been reported with main group elements in the s-block. In 1971, Andrews et al. reported the synthesis of two lithium dinitrogen complexes via simultaneous deposition of samples of nitrogen gas and lithium atomic beams onto a cesium iodide window at 15K. The N-enriched matrices were recovered via recondensation in liquid helium. The deposited samples were monitored via infrared spectroscopy, allowing the authors to observe two new absorptions in the matrix of lithium and nitrogen atoms. The resulting IR spectra also showed shifts at 1800 and 1535 cm^{−1}, corresponding to nitrogen-nitrogen vibrations. Two new dinitrogen complexes of lithium were thus reported: LiN_{2} and LiN_{2}N_{2}, lithium supernitride and lithium disupernitride, respectively.

Further work with lithium involved reaction of metallic lithium with ethylene and N_{2} under an inert atmosphere yielding the Li(C_{2}H_{4})(N_{2}) complex, in which N_{2} is only weakly coordinated, as well as Li^{+}N_{2}^{−}, whose formation ethylene catalyzes. In 1986, Andrews et al. synthesized and characterized both kinds of products spectroscopically.

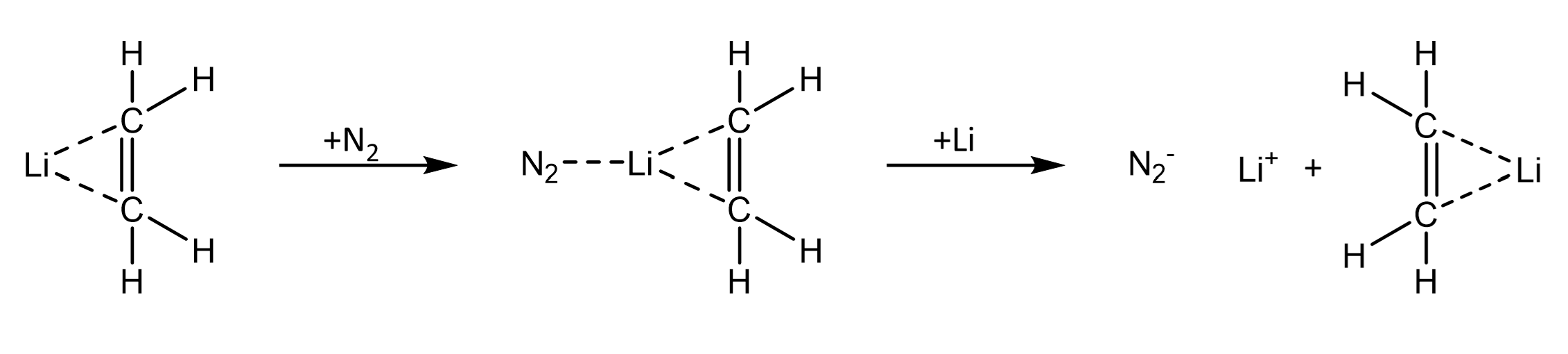
Andrews et al.'s synthesis of Li(C_{2}H_{4})(N_{2}) via the reaction of ethylene and lithium metal under N_{2}, followed by the subsequent addition of Li.

While most main group complexes of dinitrogen involve end-on binding, in 2020, a collaboration between Mingfei Zhou and Gernot Frenking saw the first reported covalently bonded side-on N_{2} adducts of a main group element, with NNBe(η^{2}-N_{2}) and (NN)_{2}Be(η^{2}-N_{2}). Pulsed laser evaporated beryllium atoms were allowed to react with N_{2} in neon at 4 K, allowing these collaborators to identify various beryllium dinitrogen products via infrared absorption spectroscopy. They further investigated isomers of Be(NN)_{n} with n=2 or 3 using computational studies involving DFT at the M06-2X-D3/cc-pVTZ level and calculations at the CCSD(T)-Full/aug-cc-pVQZ, which identified the NNBe(η^{2}-N_{2}) and (NN)_{2}Be(η^{2}-N_{2}) as the most energetically favorable isomers. Energy decomposition analysis (EDA) was used to confirm the characterization of these species as side-on N_{2} adducts as opposed to cyclic metalladiazirines governed by (NN)_{n}Be→ η^{2}-N_{2} π back-donation, a determination which was further supported by the authors’ QTAIM analysis. The reported Laplacian contour maps of these species displayed bond critical points and regions of local charge concentration pointing from the Be atoms to the η^{2}-N_{2} ligands, hence the classification of these species as π-bonded.

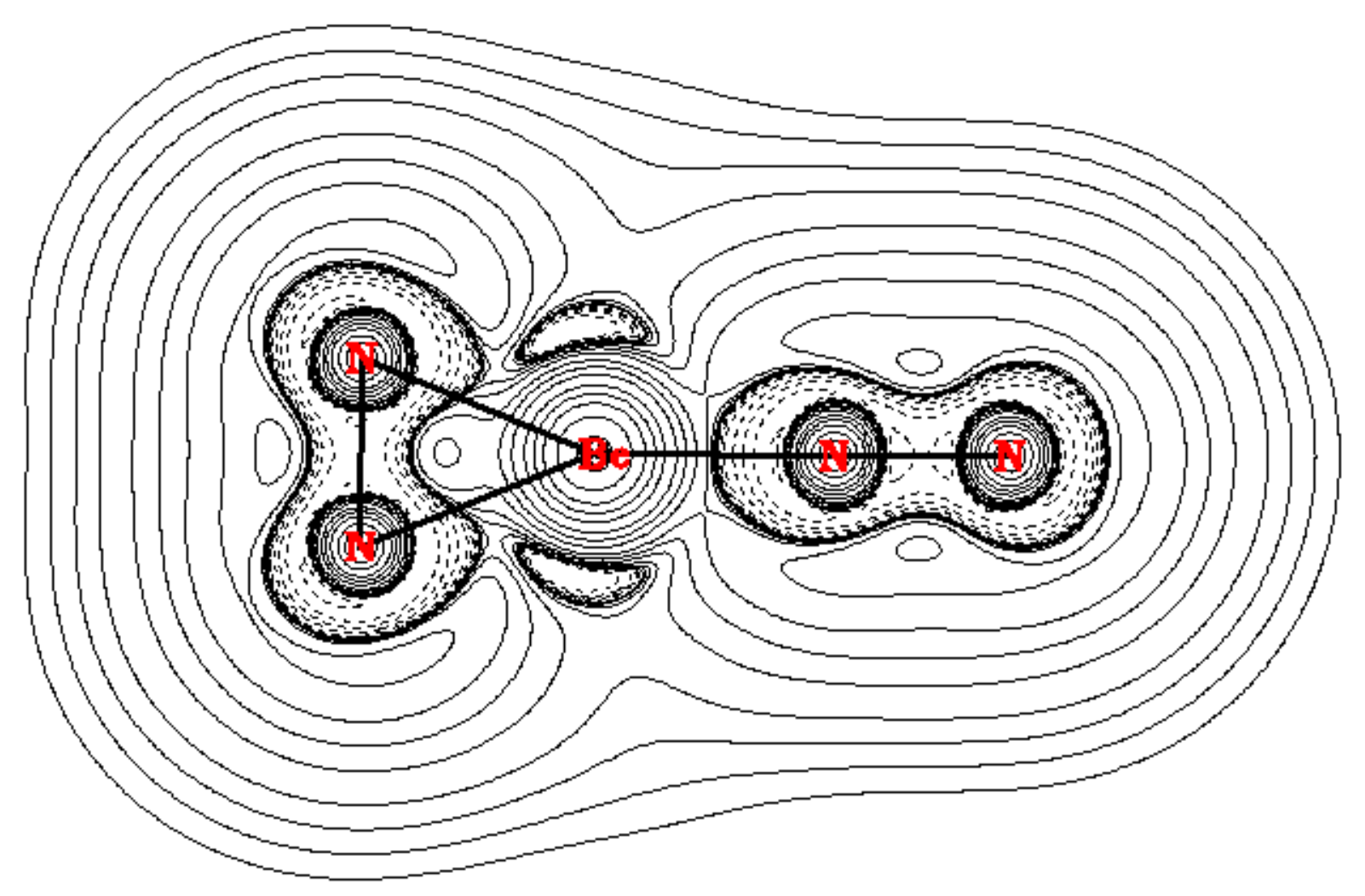
A Laplacian contour map of NNBe(η^{2}-N_{2}), representing the type of computation used by the Zhou and Frenking collaboration to determine the side-bound nature of N_{2} in this species and its π classification.

Subsequent computational work by Rovaletti and coworkers highlighted the relevance of side-on bonding of dinitrogen to alkaline earth metals in that Ca(I) can bind dinitrogen in a side-on manner, but Mg(I) cannot bind dinitrogen because the N_{2} would be inserted end-on in the most stable conformation, which would have a triplet ground state. Molecular orbital analysis confirmed the energetic favorability of N_{2} binding to Ca(I) over Mg(I), the latter of which has not yet been experimentally reported to have any activity toward N_{2}.

Later alkaline earth metals have received growing attention for their potential to mimic transition metal reactivity with respect to dinitrogen in an effort to study the N_{2} analogues of eight-coordinate metal carbonyl complexes of calcium, strontium, and barium. A 2020 paper reported DFT calculations indicating that cubic alkaline earth complexes of N_{2} and CO may share similar activation ligand activation capabilities, though such reactivity remains to be demonstrated experimentally.
