= Manganese fluoride =

Manganese fluoride can refer to:

- Manganese(II) fluoride, MnF_{2}
- Manganese(III) fluoride, MnF_{3}
- Manganese(IV) fluoride, MnF_{4}

These three compounds are the totality of binary manganese fluorides that have been well characterized.

Manganese(V) fluoride, MnF_{5}, is a binary hypothetical inorganic compound of manganese and fluorine.
