= Gold heptafluoride =

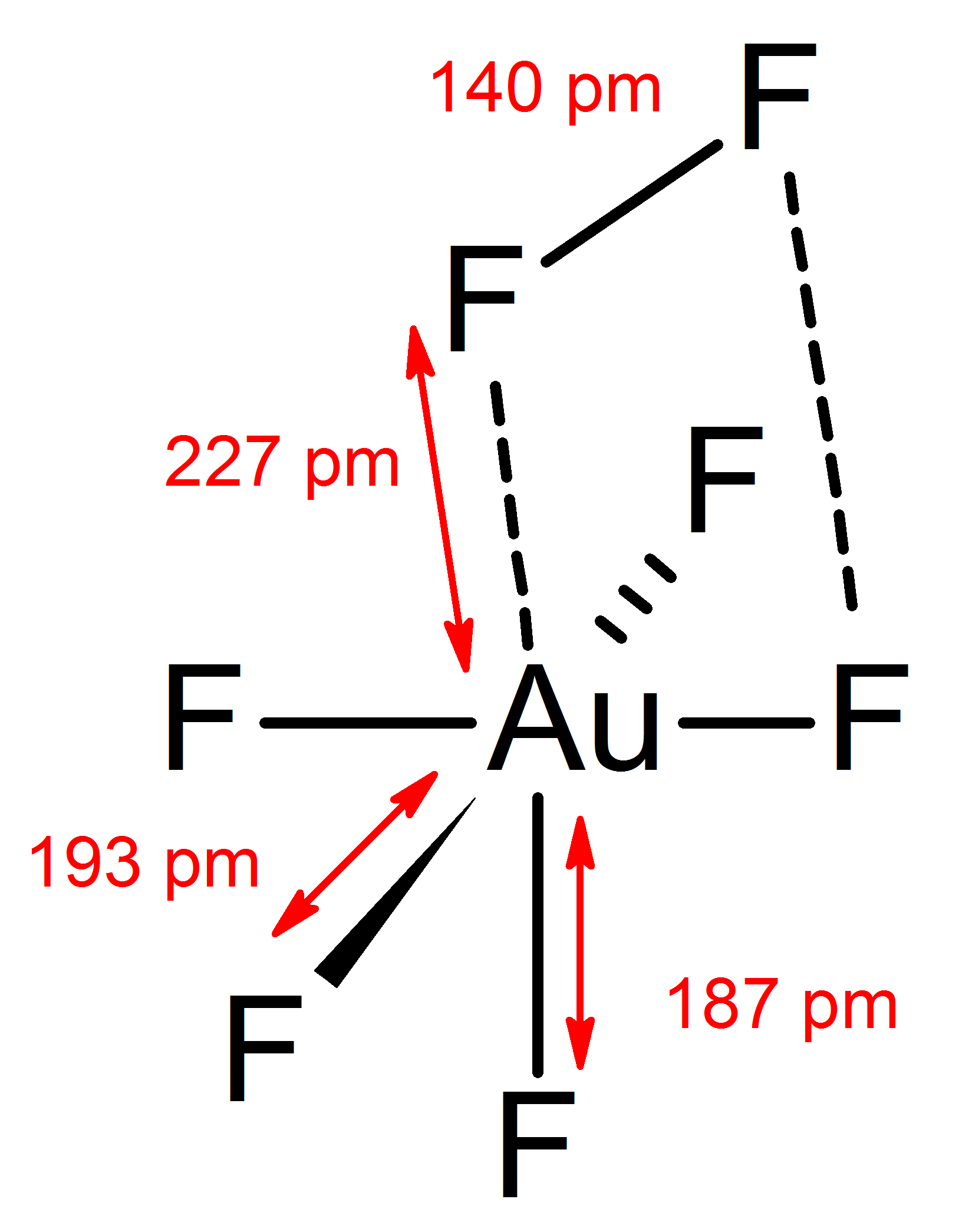
Gold heptafluoride
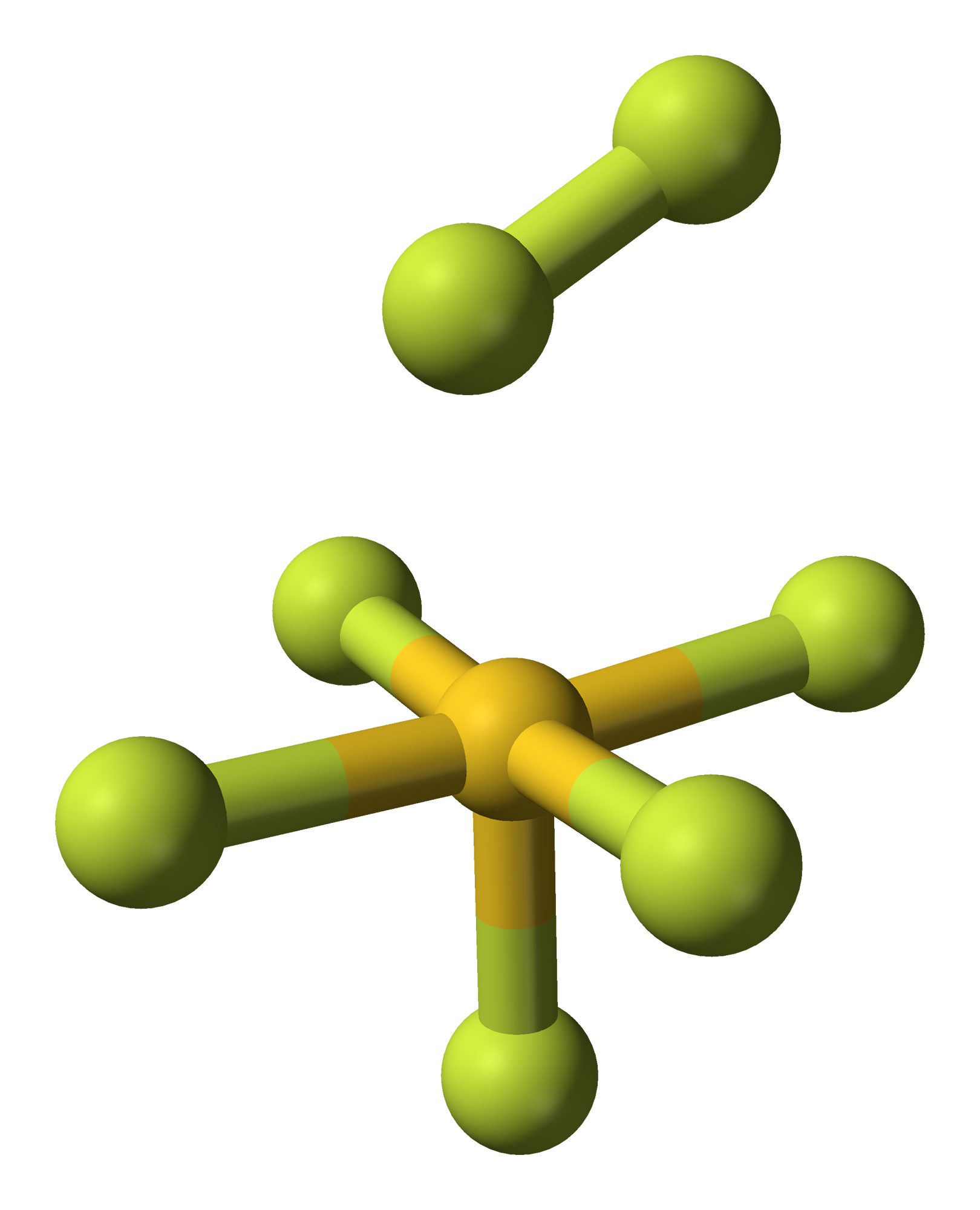

Names
- IUPAC name Difluorinegold(V) fluoride
- Other names Gold heptafluoride

Identifiers
3D model (JSmol)	Interactive image
- InChI: InChI=1S/Au.F2.5FH/c;1-2;;;;;/h;;5*1H/q+5;;;;;;/p-5 Key: IIWIEJHPIFUIKA-UHFFFAOYSA-I
- SMILES: F[Au](F)(F)(F)F.FF

Properties
Chemical formula	AuF_{7}
Molar mass	329.96 g/mol
Appearance	Pale-yellow solid
Melting point	100 °C (212 °F; 373 K) (decomposes)
Solubility in water	Reacts
Vapor pressure	>30 mmHg

Hazards
- Occupational safety and health (OHS/OSH)
Main hazards	Corrosive, toxic

Related compounds
Other cations	ReF_{7}, IF_{7}
Related compounds	AuF_{3}, AuF_{5}
- Except where otherwise noted, data are given for materials in their standard state (at 25 °C [77 °F], 100 kPa). verify (what is ?) Infobox references

Gold heptafluoride is a gold(V) compound with the empirical formula AuF_{7}. The synthesis of this compound from gold pentafluoride and a monatomic fluorine plasma was first reported in 1986. However, current calculations suggest that the structure of the synthesized molecule was actually a difluorine ligand on a gold pentafluoride core, AuF_{5}·F_{2}. That would make it the first difluorine complex and the first compound containing a fluorine atom with an oxidation state of zero. The gold(V)–difluorine complex is calculated to be 205 kJ/mol more stable than "true" gold(VII) fluoride. The vibrational frequency at 734 cm^{−1} is the hallmark of the end-on coordinated difluorine molecule.

Gold heptafluoride decomposes at 100 °C to gold(V) fluoride releasing fluorine gas:

AuF_{5}·F_{2} → AuF_{5} + F_{2}

It also undergoes hydrolysis in water.
