= Rhenium pentafluoride =

Names
- Other names Rhenium(V) fluoride

Identifiers
CAS Number	30937-52-1
3D model (JSmol)	Interactive image
PubChem CID	15796911
- InChI: InChI=1S/5FH.Re/h5*1H;/q;;;;;+5/p-5 Key: UKUWGTWCIFEMQK-UHFFFAOYSA-I
- SMILES: F[Re](F)(F)(F)F

Properties
Chemical formula	F_{5}Re
Molar mass	281.199 g·mol^{−1}
Appearance	yellow-green crystals
Density	g/cm^{3}
Melting point	48 °C (118 °F; 321 K)
Boiling point	221.3 °C (430.3 °F; 494.4 K)
Solubility in water	reacts with water

Structure
Crystal structure	orthorhombic

Related compounds
Related compounds	Osmium pentafluoride
- Except where otherwise noted, data are given for materials in their standard state (at 25 °C [77 °F], 100 kPa). Infobox references

Rhenium pentafluoride is a binary inorganic compound of rhenium and fluorine with the chemical formula ReF_{5}. This is a salt of rhenium and hydrofluoric acid.

== Synthesis ==
Rhenium pentafluoride can be synthesised by the reduction of rhenium hexafluoride with hydrogen, rhenium, or tungsten:

2ReF_{6} + H_{2} → 2ReF_{5} + 2HF

5ReF_{6} + Re → 6ReF_{5}

6ReF_{6} + W → 6ReF_{5} + WF_{6}

== Physical properties ==
Rhenium pentafluoride forms yellow-green crystals of orthorhombic crystal system, cell parameters a = 0.57 nm, b = 1.723 nm, c = 0.767 nm.

Rhenium pentafluoride reacts with water.

Rhenium pentafluoride is volatile. The compound consists of dimers of composition Re_{2}F_{10}.
