= Osmium pentafluoride =

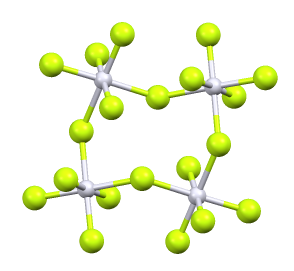

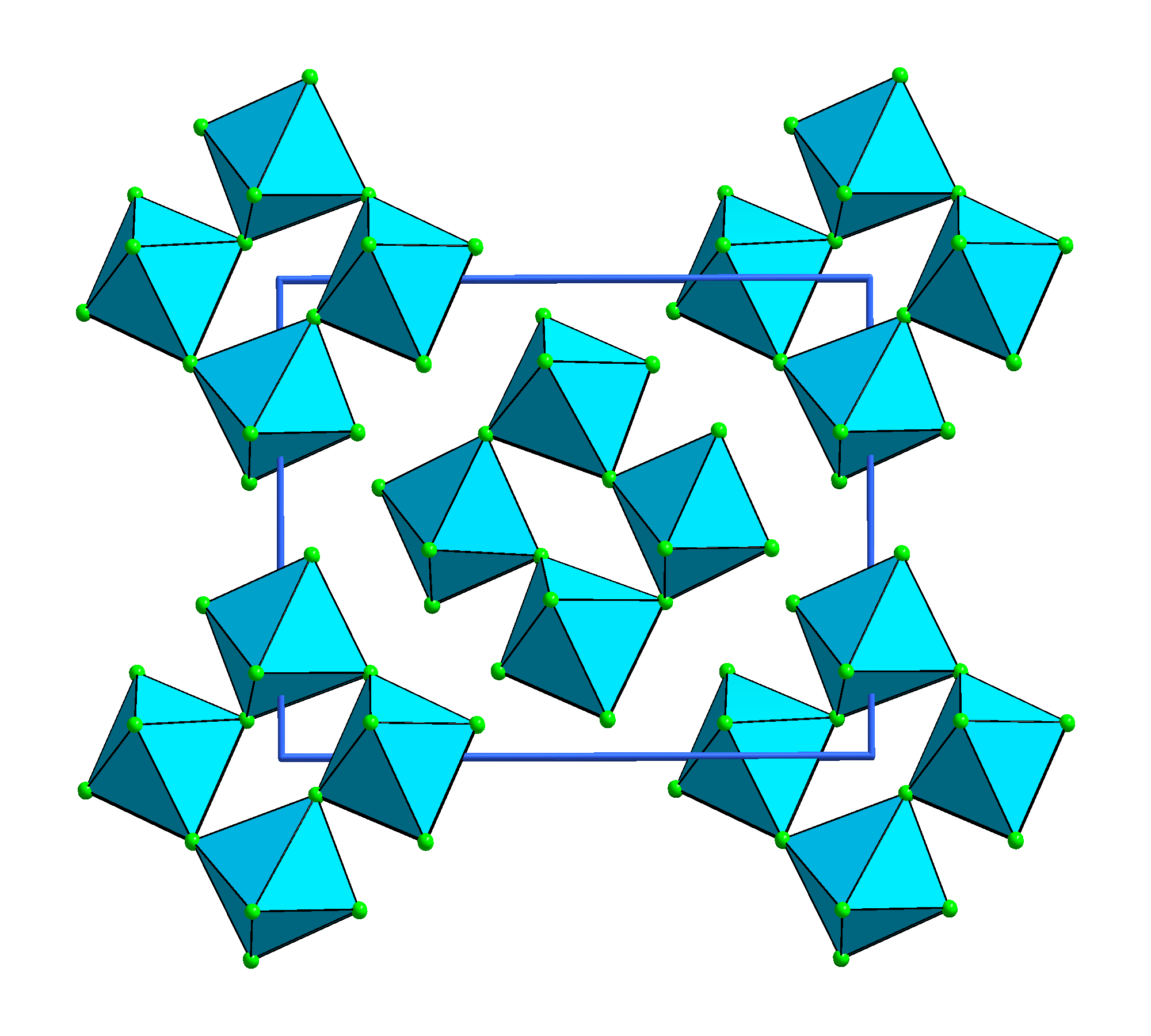

Identifiers
CAS Number	31576-40-6
3D model (JSmol)	monomer: Interactive image; tetramer: Interactive image
ChemSpider	103874289
PubChem CID	15797581
- InChI: InChI=1S/5FH.Os/h5*1H;/q;;;;;+5/p-5 Key: RFWLPKSDISVSGM-UHFFFAOYSA-I
- SMILES: monomer: F[Os](F)(F)(F)F; tetramer: F[Os-]1(F)(F)(F)[F+][Os-](F)(F)(F)(F)[F+][Os-](F)(F)(F)(F)[F+][Os-](F)(F)(F)(F)[F+]1

Properties
Chemical formula	F_{5}Os
Molar mass	285.22 g·mol^{−1}
Appearance	blue-green solid
Melting point	70 °C (158 °F; 343 K)

Structure
Crystal structure	Monoclinic
Space group	P2_{1}/c (No. 14)
Lattice constant	a = 5.53 Å, b = 9.91 Å, c = 12.59 Å α = 90°, β = 99.5°, γ = 90°
Lattice volume (V)	680 Å^{3}
Formula units (Z)	8 units per cell
- Except where otherwise noted, data are given for materials in their standard state (at 25 °C [77 °F], 100 kPa). Infobox references

Osmium pentafluoride is an inorganic compound with the formula OsF_{5}. It is a blue-green solid. Like the pentafluorides of Ru, Rh, and Ir, OsF_{5} exists as a tetramer in the solid state.

== Preparation ==
Osmium pentafluoride can be prepared by reduction of osmium hexafluoride with iodine as a solution in iodine pentafluoride:

10 OsF_{6} + I_{2} → 10 OsF_{5} + 2 IF_{5}

It can also be prepared by treating a solution of osmium hexafluoride in anhydrous hydrogen fluoride with hydrogen or silicon. Platinum gauze or UV irradiation increase the reaction rate.
