= Difluoroamino sulfur pentafluoride =

Names
- Other names: Difluoro(pentafluorosulfur)amine; Pentafluorosulfanyldifluoramine; Pentafluorosulfanyl N,N-difluoramine

Identifiers
CAS Number	13693-10-2
3D model (JSmol)	Interactive image
ChemSpider	123067
PubChem CID	139547
CompTox Dashboard (EPA)	DTXSID40160011
- InChI: InChI=1/F7NS/c1-8(2)9(3,4,5,6)7 Key: QCVDQGPCVDNCIO-UHFFFAOYSA-N
- SMILES: FN(F)S(F)(F)(F)(F)F

Properties
Chemical formula	SF_{5}NF_{2}
Molar mass	179.062 g/mol
Appearance	Colourless gas
- Except where otherwise noted, data are given for materials in their standard state (at 25 °C [77 °F], 100 kPa). (what is ?) Infobox references

Difluoroamino sulfur pentafluoride is a gaseous chemical compound of fluorine, sulfur, and nitrogen. It is unusual in having a hexa-coordinated sulfur atom with a link to nitrogen. Other names for this substance include difluoro(pentafluorosulfur)amine, pentafluorosulfanyldifluoramine, and pentafluorosulfanyl N,N-difluoramine.

== Properties ==
Difluoroamino sulfur pentafluoride is a colourless gas at room temperature. The molecule is shaped as a tetragonal bipyramid around the sulfur atom.

To within half a degree the boiling point is -17.5 °C.

Difluoroamino sulfur pentafluoride is stable at room temperature, but decomposes on the timescale of hours at 80 °C. Decomposition results in sulfur tetrafluoride and nitrogen trifluoride. It is not stable above 220 °C. It is stable with water or stainless steel.

When stored in quartz and exposed to ultraviolet light, it decomposes slightly and reacts with silica to make SF_{4}, N_{2}F_{4}, SF_{6}, NF_{3}, SO_{2}F_{2}, SOF_{4} and N_{2}O.

The bond between sulfur and nitrogen is quite weak with a dissociation energy of 50 kcal/mol.

The infrared spectrum contains strong absorption bands around 885, 910, and 950 cm^{−1} due to the bonds with fluorine. If a strong irradiation at 910 cm^{−1} with a laser takes place the molecules can be disrupted to form S_{2}F_{10}, SF_{4} and N_{2}F_{4}. By adjusting the frequency of a laser, the break up can be made isotope selective, and also the S_{2}F_{10} can be broken up by another nearby frequency.

The fluorine atoms attached to the sulfur are attached at close to 90° from each other, and the four around the equator are also at 90° from the nitrogen sulfur bond. The angle subtended by fluorine atoms on the nitrogen atom is about 98°, and the sulfur-nitrogen-fluorine angle is about 111°. The distance between sulfur and the four equatorial fluorine atoms is 1.545 Å. The axial fluorine to sulfur distance is 1.556 Å. Nitrogen sulfur distance is about 1.696 Å. The fluorine-nitrogen bond is the shortest in the molecule at 1.378 Å.

== Preparation ==
Difluoroamino sulfur pentafluoride has been prepared by irradiating a mixture of dinitrogen tetrafluoride and sulfur tetrafluoride with ultraviolet light.

N_{2}F_{4} + 2 SF_{4} → 2 SF_{5}NF_{2}.

This preparation also works with a mixture of dinitrogen tetrafluoride and sulfur chloride pentafluoride. Formation requires the appearance of the SF_{5} radical and chlorine atoms, as well as the nitrogen difluoride radical.

Another way to make difluoroamino sulfur pentafluoride is by heating dinitrogen tetrafluoride and sulfur. This results in the temporary formation of nitrogen difluoride. However the yield is only around 6%, and mostly sulfur tetrafluoride is formed. Yet other substrates for dinitrogen tetrafluoride are disulfur decafluoride or sulfur dioxide or thiophosgene in an electric discharge.

A corona discharge in a sulfur hexafluoride, nitrogen mixture produces a small amount of difluoroamino sulfur pentafluoride. This is important as high voltage equipment is often insulated with this gas combination.

Pentafluorosulfanylamine reacts with fluorine gas to yield difluoroamino sulfur pentafluoride:

SF_{5}NH_{2} + 2 F_{2} → SF_{5}NF_{2} + 2 HF

== Reactions ==
Difluoroamino sulfur pentafluoride reacts with Lewis acids like KrF^{+}AsF_{6}^{−} at -31 °C to yield SF_{6}, Kr, NF_{3} and solid N_{2}F^{+}AsF_{6}^{−}. With AsF_{5} at -196 °C (as liquid) it produces solid N_{2}F^{+}AsF_{6}^{−}, SF_{6} and trans-N_{2}F_{2}. Similar products also come from room temperature reactions.

== Use ==
There is a Russian patent to use a combination of alkenes and difluoroamino sulfur pentafluoride as a rocket fuel.

== Related ==
Related substances include fluoroimidotetrafluorosulfur F_{4}S=NF and (SF_{5})_{2}NF. A tertiary amine exists with formula (SF_{5})_{3}N.

Other variant substitutions on the nitrogen atom yield SF_{5}NFCl, SF_{5}NHF, SF_{5}NCl_{2} and SF_{5}NH_{2}.
