= Nitrogen pentafluoride =

Names
- IUPAC name Nitrogen pentafluoride

Identifiers
CAS Number	13706-13-3
3D model (JSmol)	ionic: Interactive image; covalent: Interactive image
PubChem CID	164180203 ionic
- InChI: InChI=1S/F4N.FH/c1-5(2,3)4;/h;1H/q+1;/p-1 Key: HGLYTTWJVOQBNH-UHFFFAOYSA-M; InChI=1S/F5N/c1-6(2,3,4)5 Key: IFPFUYZWFMFDTL-UHFFFAOYSA-N
- SMILES: ionic: F[N+](F)(F)F.[F-]; covalent: FN(F)(F)(F)F

Properties
Chemical formula	NF_{5}
Molar mass	108.999 g·mol^{−1}

Structure
Molecular shape	trigonal bipyramidal
Dipole moment	0 D

Related compounds
Other cations	Phosphorus pentafluoride Arsenic pentafluoride Antimony pentafluoride Bismuth pentafluoride
Related compounds	Nitrogen monofluoride; Nitrogen difluoride; Nitrogen trifluoride; Tetrafluoroammonium; Vanadium pentafluoride
- Except where otherwise noted, data are given for materials in their standard state (at 25 °C [77 °F], 100 kPa). Infobox references

Nitrogen pentafluoride is a hypothetical chemical compound of nitrogen and fluorine with the chemical formula NF_{5}. It is hypothesized to exist based on the existence of the pentafluorides of the atoms below nitrogen in the periodic table, such as phosphorus pentafluoride. Theoretical models of the nitrogen pentafluoride molecule are either a trigonal bipyramidal covalently bound molecule with symmetry group D_{3h}, or [NF_{4}]^{+}F^{−} (tetrafluoroammonium fluoride), which would be an ionic solid.

== Ionic solid ==
A variety of other tetrafluoroammonium salts are known ([NF_{4}]^{+}X^{−}), as are fluoride salts of other ammonium cations ([NR_{4}]^{+}F^{−}).

In 1966, W. E. Tolberg first synthesized a five-valent nitrogen compound of nitrogen and fluorine when tetrafluoroammonium compounds, tetrafluoroammonium hexafluoroantimonate(V) [NF_{4}]^{+}[SbF_{6}]^{−} and tetrafluoroammonium hexafluoroarsenate(V) [NF_{4}]^{+}[AsF_{6}]^{−} were made. In 1971 C. T. Goetschel announced the preparation of [NF_{4}]^{+}[BF_{4}]^{−} and also produced a white solid assumed to be tetrafluoroammonium fluoride ([NF_{4}]^{+}F^{−}). This was made by treating nitrogen trifluoride and fluorine with 3 MeV electron radiation at 77 K. It decomposed above 143 K back into those ingredients. Theoretical studies also show the ionic compound is very likely to decompose to nitrogen trifluoride and fluorine gas.

Karl O. Christe synthesised bis(tetrafluoroammonium) hexafluoronickelate(IV) ([NF_{4}]^{+})_{2}[NiF_{6}]^{2−}. He also prepared compounds with manganese, a fluorouranate, tetrafluoroammonium perchlorate [NF_{4}]^{+}ClO^{−}_{4}, tetrafluoroammonium fluorosulfate [NF_{4}]^{+}SO_{3}F^{−} and [N_{2}F_{3}]^{+} (trifluorodiazenium) salts. Christe attempted to make [NF_{4}]^{+}F^{−} by metathesis of [NF_{4}]^{+}[SbF_{6}]^{−} with CsF in HF solvent at 20 °C. However, a variant, tetrafluoroammonium bifluoride hydrofluorates ([NF_{4}]^{+}[HF_{2}]^{−}·nHF), was produced. At room temperature it was a milky liquid, but when cooled, turned pasty. At −45 °C it had the form of a white solid. When reheated it frothed, giving off F_{2}, HF, and NF_{3} as gases. This has CAS number 71485-49-9.

I. J. Solomon believed that nitrogen pentafluoride was produced by the thermal decomposition of [NF_{4}]^{+}[AsF_{6}]^{−}, but experimental results were not reproduced.

Dominik Kurzydłowski and Patryk Zaleski-Ejgierd predict that a mixture of fluorine and nitrogen trifluoride under pressure between 10 and 33 GPa forms [NF_{4}]^{+}F^{−} with space group R3m. This is a high-pressure oxidation. Over 33 GPa it will form a stable ionic compound with formula ([NF_{4}]^{+})_{2}[NF_{6}]^{−}F^{−} (bis(tetrafluoroammonium) hexafluoronitrate(V) fluoride) with space group I4/m. Over 151 GPa this is predicted to transform to [NF_{4}]^{+}[NF_{6}]^{−} (tetrafluoroammonium hexafluoronitrate(V)) with space group P4/n. A NF_{5} molecular compound is not stable under any pressure conditions.

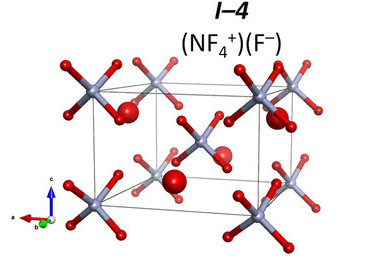
[NF_{4}]^{+}F^{−} R3m structure

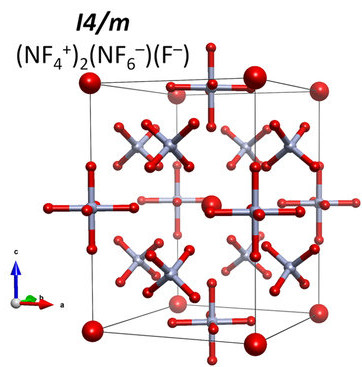
([NF_{4}]^{+})_{2}[NF_{6}]^{−}F^{−} I4/m structure

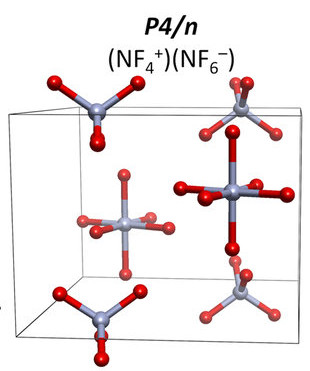
[NF_{4}]^{+}[NF_{6}]^{−} P4/n structure

== Covalent molecule ==
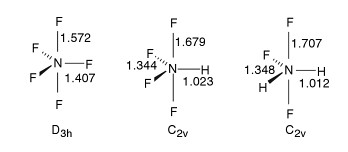
Possible structure of NF_{5} (left) and analogous fluorohydrides

Assuming a structure of a central nitrogen atom bonded to five fluorine atoms, at least some nitrogen–fluorine bonds are forced to be longer than usual because there is insufficient space around the N at typical N–F covalent-bond lengths. A trigonal bipyramidal molecular geometry (D_{3h} symmetry), with the two axial bonds elongated as is common in this type of molecular geometry, is predicted. This linear F–N–F set of atoms would have a three-center four-electron bond, with reduced bond order and increased ionic character for each N–F. Calculations further show that fragmentation to form NF_{4} and F radicals would have a transition state barrier of around 66–84 kJ/mol (15.8–20.0 kcal/mol) and that this process is thermodynamically favourable (exothermic) by 38 kJ/mol (9 kcal/mol). Nitrogen pentafluoride also violates the octet rule in which compounds with eight outer shell electrons are particularly stable.
