= Trifluorooxonium =

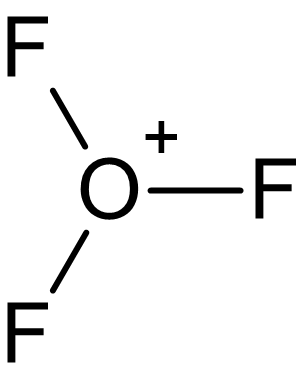

Names
- Other names Trifluorooxonium cation

Identifiers
CAS Number	64710-09-4
3D model (JSmol)	Interactive image
ChemSpider	57571475
PubChem CID	12570214
CompTox Dashboard (EPA)	DTXSID40502912
- InChI: InChI=1S/F3O/c1-4(2)3/q+1 Key: RSPXFQXKSPOINH-UHFFFAOYSA-N
- SMILES: F[O+](F)F

Properties
Chemical formula	OF^{+}_{3}
Molar mass	72.994 g·mol^{−1}
- Except where otherwise noted, data are given for materials in their standard state (at 25 °C [77 °F], 100 kPa). Infobox references

The trifluorooxonium cation is a hypothetical positively charged polyatomic ion with chemical formula OF^{+}_{3}. It is structurally equivalent to the hydronium ion where the hydrogen atoms surrounding the central oxygen atom have been replaced by fluorine, and is isoelectronic with nitrogen trifluoride. This cation would be an example of oxygen in the unprecedented +4 oxidation state.

The OF^{+}_{3} cation was shown to be vibrationally stable at all levels of theory applied (HF, MP2, CCSD(T)). OF^{+}_{3} was proposed to possess a pyramidal structure with an O–F bond length of 1.395 Å and F–O–F bond angles of 104.2° (CCSD(T) level of theory). The F^{+} detachment energy of the OF^{+}_{3} cation was calculated to be +110.1 kcal mol^{−1}. However, the low-temperature reaction of F_{2}, OF_{2} and AsF_{5} under UV irradiation, besides unreacted starting materials only yielded the dioxygenyl salt [O_{2}]^{+}[AsF_{6}]^{−}. The oxidation of OF_{2} with KrF^{+} salts also failed to produce evidence for the title cation.

The formation of the hypothetical salt [OF_{3}]^{+}[AsF_{6}]^{−} was calculated to be about thermoneutral, but slightly unfavorable with OF_{2}(g) + F_{2}(g) + AsF_{5}(g) → [OF_{3}]^{+}[AsF_{6}]^{−}(s) = +10.5 kcal mol^{−1}.

The related anion OF_{3}^{−} is predicted to be stable too.

== See also ==
- Tetrafluoroammonium
