= Tetrafluoroammonium =

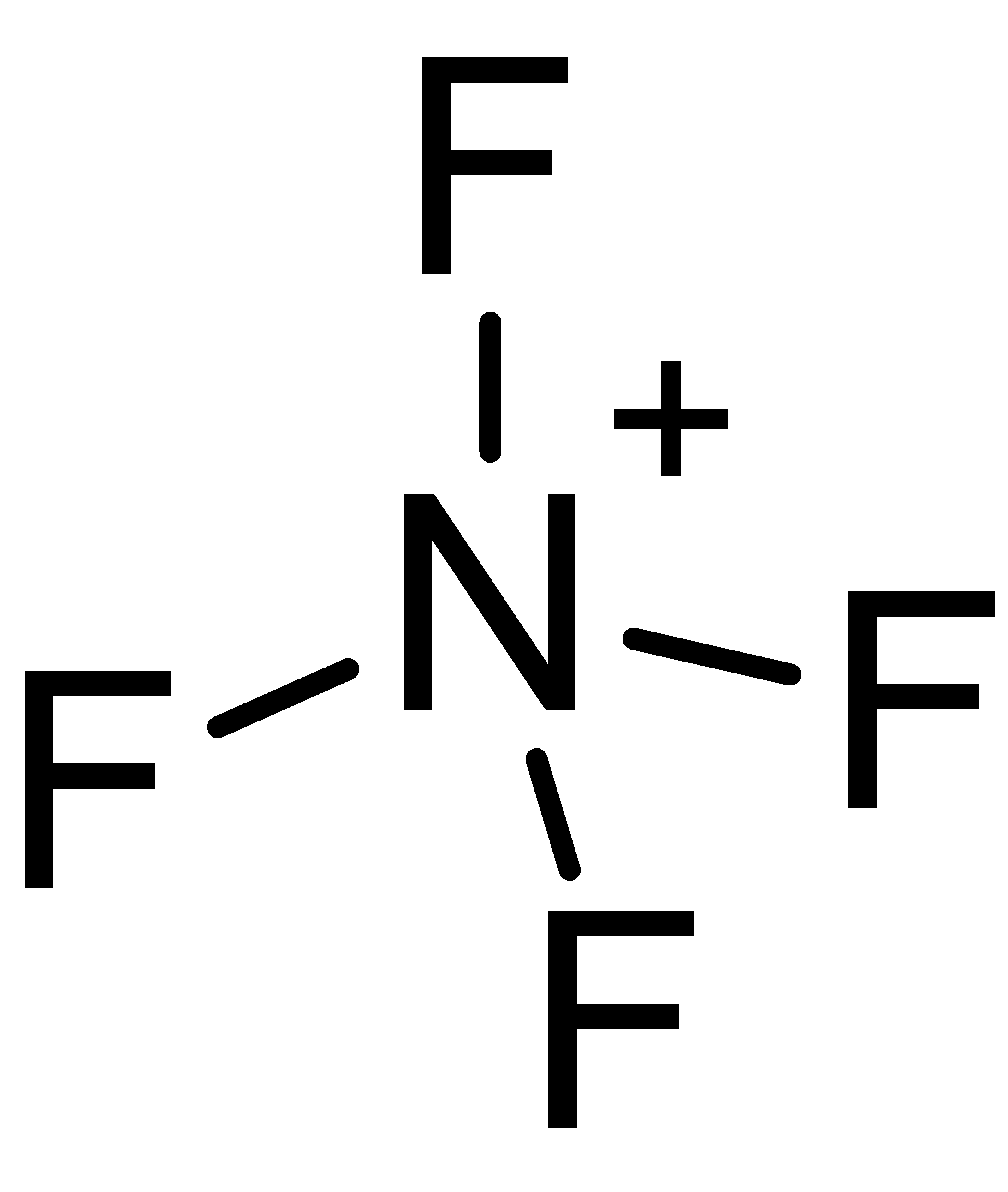
- 2D model of the tetrafluoroammonium ion

Names
- IUPAC name Tetrafluoroammonium

Identifiers
CAS Number	30494-78-1
3D model (JSmol)	Interactive image
ChEBI	CHEBI:30233
ChemSpider	4574019
Gmelin Reference	2028
PubChem CID	5460510
CompTox Dashboard (EPA)	DTXSID801045693
- InChI: InChI=1S/F4N/c1-5(2,3)4/q+1 Key: LDOAUKNENSIPAZ-UHFFFAOYSA-N
- SMILES: [N+](F)(F)(F)F

Properties
Chemical formula	F_{4}N^{+}
Molar mass	90.000 g·mol^{−1}
- Except where otherwise noted, data are given for materials in their standard state (at 25 °C [77 °F], 100 kPa). Infobox references

The tetrafluoroammonium cation (also known as perfluoroammonium) is a positively charged polyatomic ion with chemical formula NF^{+}_{4}. It is equivalent to the ammonium ion where the hydrogen atoms surrounding the central nitrogen atom have been replaced by fluorine. Tetrafluoroammonium ion is isoelectronic with tetrafluoromethane CF_{4}, trifluoramine oxide ONF_{3}, tetrafluoroborate BF^{−}_{4} anion and the tetrafluoroberyllate BeF^{2−}_{4} anion.

The tetrafluoroammonium ion forms salts with a large variety of fluorine-bearing anions. These include the bifluoride anion (HF^{−}_{2}), tetrafluorobromate (BrF^{−}_{4}), metal pentafluorides (MF^{−}_{5} where M is Ge, Sn, or Ti), hexafluorides (MF^{−}_{6} where M is P, As, Sb, Bi, or Pt), heptafluorides (MF^{−}_{7} where M is W, U, or Xe), octafluorides (XeF^{2−}_{8}), various oxyfluorides (MF_{5}O^{−} where M is W or U; FSO^{−}_{3}, BrF_{4}O^{−}), and perchlorate (ClO^{−}_{4}). Attempts to make the nitrate salt, NF_{4}NO_{3}, were unsuccessful because of quick fluorination: NF^{+}_{4} + NO^{−}_{3} → NF_{3} + FONO_{2}.

== Structure ==
The geometry of the tetrafluoroammonium ion is tetrahedral, with an estimated nitrogen-fluorine bond length of 124 pm. All fluorine atoms are in equivalent positions.

== Synthesis ==
Tetrafluoroammonium salts are prepared by oxidising nitrogen trifluoride with fluorine in the presence of a strong Lewis acid which acts as a fluoride ion acceptor. The original synthesis by Tolberg, Rewick, Stringham, and Hill in 1966 employs antimony pentafluoride as the Lewis acid:

NF_{3} + F_{2} + SbF_{5} → NF_{4}SbF_{6}

The hexafluoroarsenate salt was also prepared by a similar reaction with arsenic pentafluoride at 120 °C:

NF_{3} + F_{2} + AsF_{5} → NF_{4}AsF_{6}

The reaction of nitrogen trifluoride with fluorine and boron trifluoride at 800 °C yields the tetrafluoroborate salt:

NF_{3} + F_{2} + BF_{3} → NF_{4}BF_{4}

NF^{+}_{4} salts can also be prepared by fluorination of NF_{3} with krypton difluoride (KrF_{2}) and fluorides of the form MF_{n}, where M is Sb, Nb, Pt, Ti, or B. For example, reaction of NF_{3} with KrF_{2} and TiF_{4} yields [NF^{+}_{4}]_{2}TiF^{2−}_{6}.

NF_{3} + 3 RuF_{6} → [NF_{4}][Ru_{3}F_{16}] + 1/_{2} F_{2}

Many tetrafluoroammonium salts can be prepared with metathesis reactions.

== Reactions ==
Tetrafluoroammonium salts are extremely hygroscopic. The NF^{+}_{4} ion, when dissolved in water, readily decomposes into NF_{3}, H_{2}F^{+}, and oxygen gas. Some hydrogen peroxide (H_{2}O_{2}) is also formed during this process:

NF^{+}_{4} + H_{2}O → NF_{3} + H_{2}F^{+} + 1/2 O_{2}

NF^{+}_{4} + 2 H_{2}O → NF_{3} + H_{2}F^{+} + H_{2}O_{2}

Reaction of NF^{+}_{4}SbF^{−}_{6} with alkali metal nitrates yields fluorine nitrate, FONO_{2}.

== Properties ==
Because NF^{+}_{4} salts are destroyed by water, water cannot be used as a solvent. Instead, bromine trifluoride, bromine pentafluoride, iodine pentafluoride, or anhydrous hydrogen fluoride can be used.

Tetrafluoroammonium salts usually have no colour. However, some are coloured due to other elements in them. (NF^{+}_{4})_{2}CrF^{2−}_{6}, (NF^{+}_{4})_{2}NiF^{2−}_{6} and (NF^{+}_{4})_{2}PtF^{2−}_{6} have a red colour, while (NF^{+}_{4})_{2}MnF^{2−}_{6}, NF^{+}_{4}UF^{−}_{7}, NF^{+}_{4}UOF^{−}_{5} and NF^{+}_{4}XeF^{−}_{7} are yellow.

== Applications ==
NF^{+}_{4} salts are important for solid propellant NF_{3}–F_{2} gas generators. They are also used as reagents for electrophilic fluorination of aromatic compounds in organic chemistry. As fluorinating agents, they are also strong enough to react with methane.

== See also ==
- Trifluorooxonium
- Nitrogen pentafluoride
