= Trifluoramine oxide =

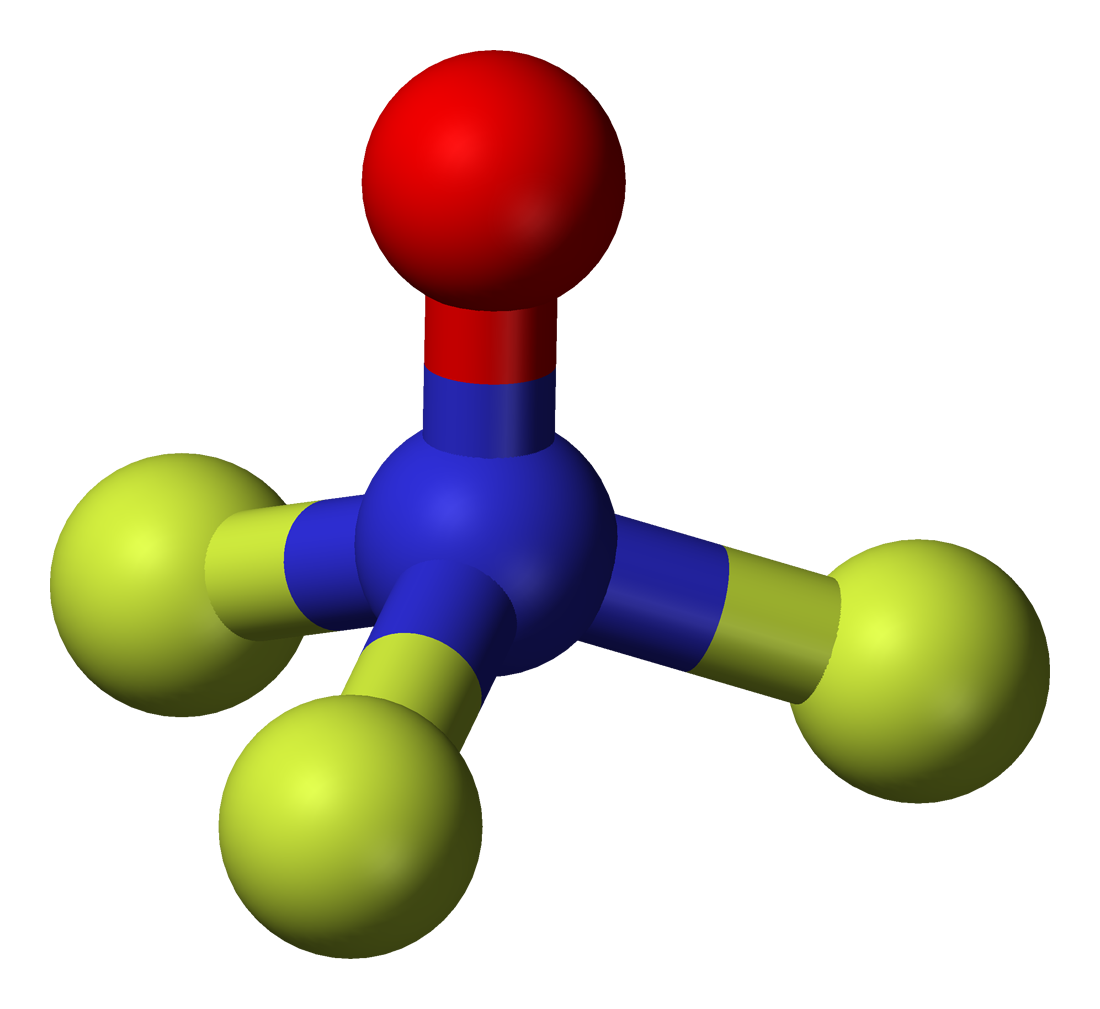

Identifiers
CAS Number	13847-65-9
3D model (JSmol)	Interactive image
ChemSpider	24508
PubChem CID	26304
CompTox Dashboard (EPA)	DTXSID90160687
- InChI: InChI=1S/F3NO/c1-4(2,3)5 Key: UDOZVPVDQKQJAP-UHFFFAOYSA-N
- SMILES: [N+]([O-])(F)(F)F

Properties
Chemical formula	F_{3}NO
Molar mass	87.001 g·mol^{−1}
Appearance	Colourless gas
Melting point	−161 °C (−258 °F; 112 K)
Boiling point	−87.5 °C (−125.5 °F; 185.7 K)

Related compounds
Related compounds	Phosphoryl trifluoride; Trimethylamine N-oxide; Nitrogen trifluoride
- Except where otherwise noted, data are given for materials in their standard state (at 25 °C [77 °F], 100 kPa). Infobox references

Trifluoramine oxide or nitrogen trifluoride oxide is an inorganic molecule with the chemical formula F_{3}NO. It has strong fluorinating powers.

== Production ==
Trifluoramine oxide was first discovered in 1966 independently by two different groups. One way to produce it was by an electric discharge in a mixture of oxygen on nitrogen trifluoride. Another even less yielding method is by reacting noble metal fluorides (IrF_{6} or PtF_{6}) with nitric oxide. It is separated by distillation, and can be purified by treating it with potassium hydroxide solution which reacts with the other fluorine containing molecules produced.

An alternate way to produce it is by burning nitric acid in fluorine, followed by rapid cooling. Yet another way is the photochemical reaction of fluorine and nitrosyl fluoride:

F_{2} + FNO → F_{3}NO

This reaction can also happen with heat, but hot fluorine is hard to contain without a reaction with the container. Yet another production route is to thermally decompose nitrosonium hexafluoronickelate(IV):

[NO]_{2}[NiF_{6}] → ONF + ONF_{3} + NiF_{2}

== Properties ==
F_{3}NO is a colourless gas at standard conditions. It has a critical temperature of 29.5 °C where the density is 0.593 g/cm^{3}. Critical pressure is about 64 atmospheres.

Trifluoramine oxide has a Trouton's constant of 20.7. Heat of vapourisation at the boiling point is 3.85 kcal/mol.

The F_{3}NO molecule has C_{3V} symmetry, with all the N-F bonds being equivalent. The shape is almost a tetrahedron as N-O bond is similar to the N-F bonds in nature. The nuclear magnetic resonance (NMR) spectrum of ^{19}F has a triplet line around −363 ppm. J_{NF} is 136 Hz. The infra red spectrum N-O stretch at 1687 cm^{−1}, N-F stretch at 743 cm^{−1}, unsymmetrical N-F stretch 887 cm^{−1} ∠ONF bend 528 cm^{−1}, wither other bands at 558, 528, 801, 929, 1055, 1410, 1622, 1772, 2435, and 3345 cm^{−1}. The dipole moment is 0.0390 D.

The N-O bond has 75% double bond character. This differs from the amine oxides where the amine is much more basic and with a positive charge. The N-O bond-length is 1.158 Å; the N–F bond-length is 1.431 Å; the bond angles ∠FNF is 101°; and the three bond angles ∠ONF = 117.

Trifluoramine oxide is toxic, killing rats at a concentration over 200 ppm.

== Reactions ==
On fluorinating other compounds nitrosyl fluoride (NOF) is formed. Trifluoramine oxide does not react with water, glass or nickel, making it easier to handle. The "adducts" formed with the pentafluorides, are actually hexafluoride salts containing the [F_{2}NO]^{+} ion (difluorooxoammonium cation).

substrate	product	comment
N_{2}F_{4}	NF_{3}	
N_{2}O_{4}	NO_{2}F	
Cl_{2}	ClF	
SF_{4}	SF_{6}	
H_{2}O		no reaction
aqueous NaOH	NO^{−}_{3}, F^{−}	slow
H_{2}SO_{4}	HNO_{3}, HF	via [F_{2}NO]^{+}
SbF_{5}	[F_{2}NO]^{+}[SbF_{6}]^{−}	
AsF_{5}	[F_{2}NO]^{+}[AsF_{6}]^{−}	
PF_{5}		no reaction
BF_{3}	[F_{2}NO]^{+}[BF_{4}]^{−}, [F_{2}NO]^{+}[B_{2}F_{7}]^{−}	

Trifluoramine oxide reacts slowly with mercury, producing mercury fluorides, and nitrogen oxides. Trifluoramine oxide is fairly stable when heated to 300 °C but slowly breaks up to fluorine and NO_{2}F, NOF, NO_{2} and NO. The oxygen remains attached to the nitrogen during decomposition.
