= Disulfur decafluoride =

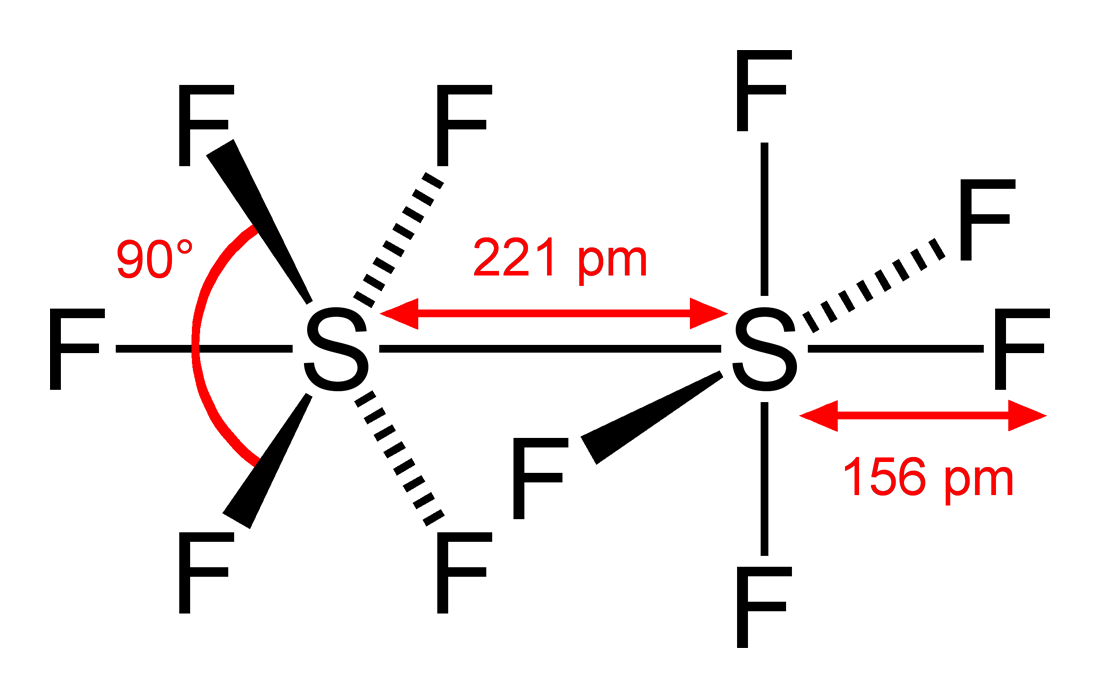
- Wireframe model of disulfur decafluoride

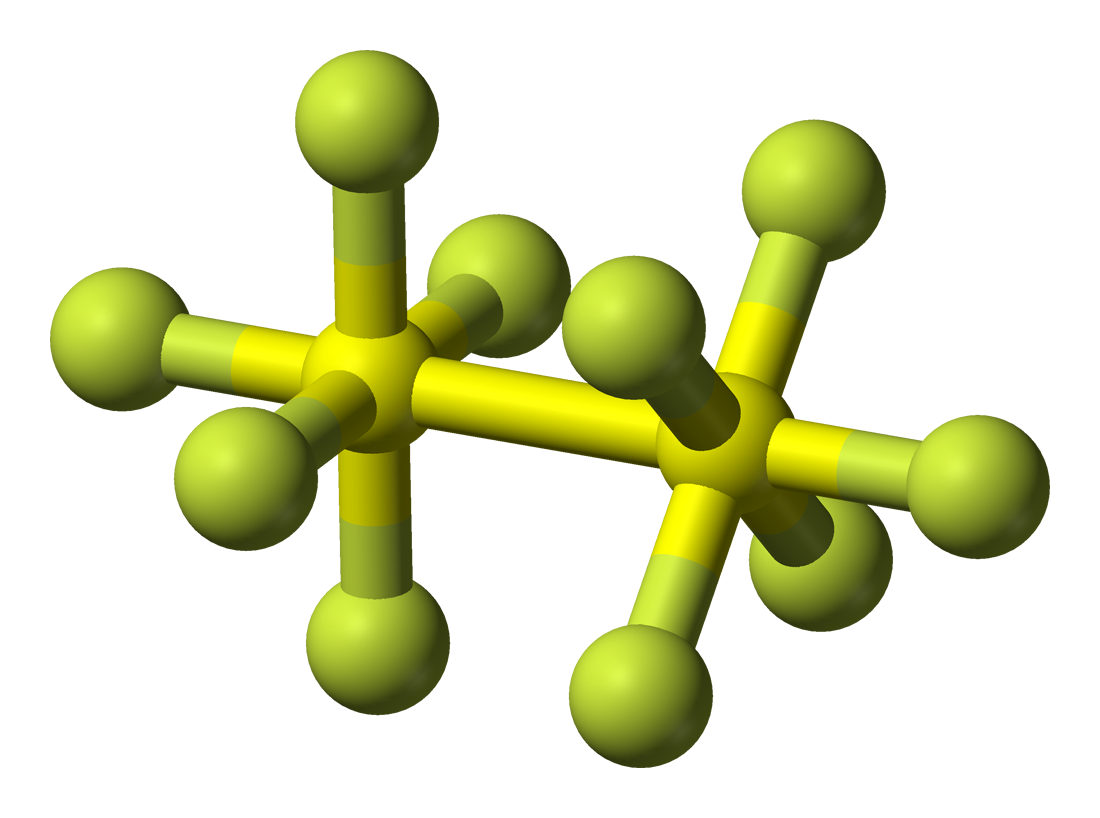
Ball-and-stick model of disulfur decafluoride
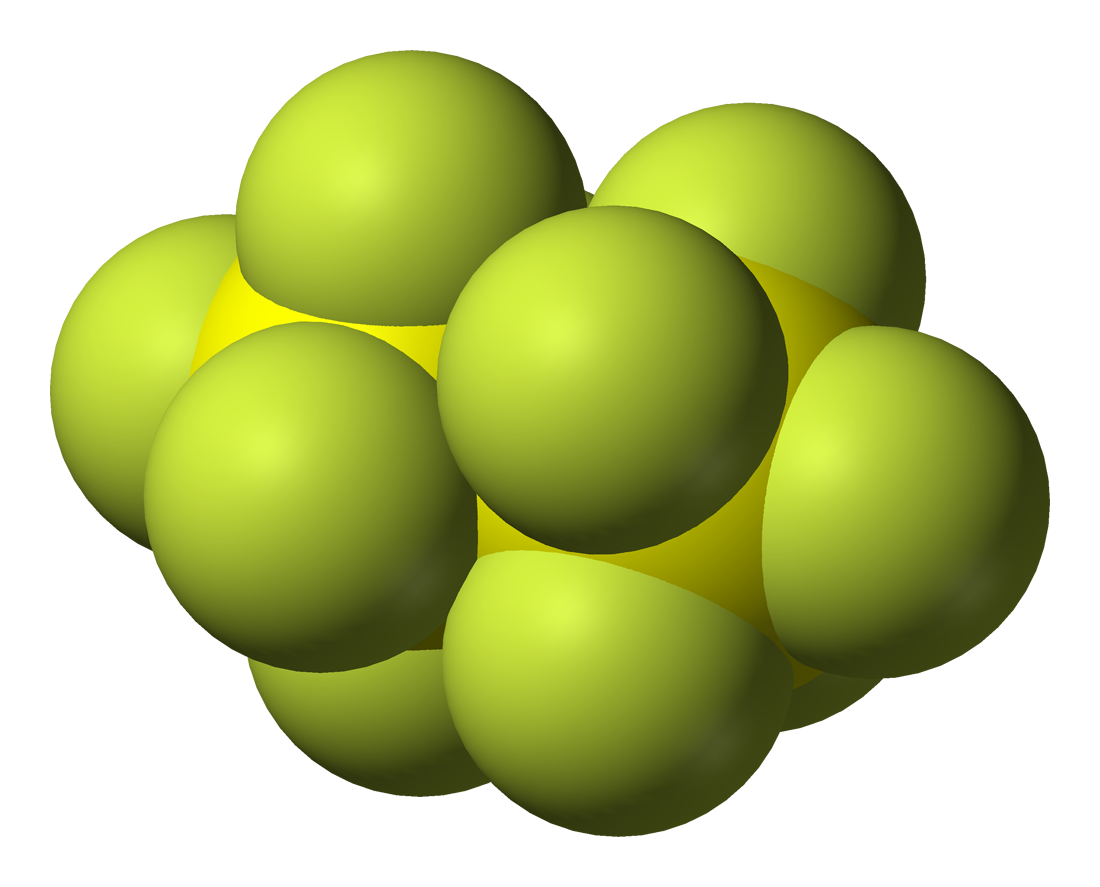
Space-filling model of disulfur decafluoride

Names
- Preferred IUPAC name Disulfur decafluoride
- Systematic IUPAC name Decafluoro-1𝜆^{6},2𝜆^{6}-disulfane
- Other names: Sulfur pentafluoride; TL-70; Agent Z

Identifiers
CAS Number	5714-22-7
3D model (JSmol)	Interactive image
ChemSpider	56348
ECHA InfoCard	100.024.732
EC Number	227-204-4
MeSH	Disulfur+decafluoride
PubChem CID	62586
RTECS number	WS4480000
UNII	5XG19I842O
UN number	3287
CompTox Dashboard (EPA)	DTXSID2073356
- InChI: InChI=1S/F10S2/c1-11(2,3,4,5)12(6,7,8,9)10 Key: BPFZRKQDXVZTFD-UHFFFAOYSA-N
- SMILES: FS(F)(F)(F)(F)S(F)(F)(F)(F)F

Properties
Chemical formula	S_{2}F_{10}
Molar mass	254.10 g·mol^{−1}
Appearance	colorless liquid
Odor	like sulfur dioxide
Density	2.08 g/cm^{3}
Melting point	−53 °C (−63 °F; 220 K)
Boiling point	30.17 °C (86.31 °F; 303.32 K)
Solubility in water	insoluble
Vapor pressure	561 mmHg (74.8 kPa) (20 °C (68 °F))

Hazards
- Occupational safety and health (OHS/OSH)
Main hazards	Poisonous
NFPA 704 (fire diamond)	4 0 0 OX
- Lethal dose or concentration (LD, LC)
LC_{50} (median concentration)	2000 mg/m^{3} (rat, 10 min); 1000 mg/m^{3} (mouse, 10 min); 4000 mg/m^{3} (rabbit, 10 min); 4000 mg/m^{3} (guinea pig, 10 min); 4000 mg/m^{3} (dog, 10 min)
- NIOSH (US health exposure limits)
PEL (Permissible)	TWA 0.025 ppm (0.25 mg/m^{3})
REL (Recommended)	C 0.01 ppm (0.1 mg/m^{3})
IDLH (Immediate danger)	1 ppm
- Except where otherwise noted, data are given for materials in their standard state (at 25 °C [77 °F], 100 kPa). Infobox references

Disulfur decafluoride is a chemical compound with the formula S_{2}F_{10}. It was discovered in 1934 by Denbigh and Whytlaw-Gray. Each sulfur atom of the S_{2}F_{10} molecule is octahedral, and surrounded by five fluorine atoms and one sulfur atom. The two sulfur atoms are connected by a single bond. In the S_{2}F_{10} molecule, the oxidation state of each sulfur atoms is +5, but their valency is 6 (they are hexavalent).

It is a colorless liquid with a burnt match smell similar to sulfur dioxide.

== Production ==
Disulfur decafluoride is produced by photolysis of SF_{5}Br, or SF_{5}Cl in H_{2}:

2 SF_{5}Br → S_{2}F_{10} + Br_{2}
2 SF_{5}Cl + 2 H_{2} → S_{2}F_{10} + HCl

Disulfur decafluoride arises by the decomposition of sulfur hexafluoride. It is produced by the electrical decomposition of sulfur hexafluoride (SF_{6})—an essentially inert insulator used in high voltage systems such as transmission lines, substations and switchgear. S_{2}F_{10} is also made during the production of SF_{6}.

== Properties ==
The S−S bond dissociation energy is 305±21 kJ/mol, about 80 kJ/mol stronger than the S−S bond in diphenyldisulfide.

At temperatures above 150 °C (302 °F), S_{2}F_{10} decomposes slowly (disproportionation) into SF_{6} and sulfur tetrafluoride (SF_{4}):

S_{2}F_{10} → SF_{6} + SF_{4}

S_{2}F_{10} reacts with tetrafluorohydrazine (N_{2}F_{4}) to give difluoroamino sulfur pentafluoride (SF_{5}NF_{2}):

S_{2}F_{10} + N_{2}F_{4} → 2 SF_{5}NF_{2}

In the presence of excess chlorine gas, S_{2}F_{10} reacts to form sulfur chloride pentafluoride (SF_{5}Cl):

S_{2}F_{10} + Cl_{2} → 2 SF_{5}Cl

The analogous reaction with bromine is reversible and yields SF_{5}Br. The reversibility of this reaction can be used to synthesize S_{2}F_{10} from SF_{5}Br.

It reacts with SO_{2} to form pentafluorosulfur fluorosulfonate (SF_{5}OSO_{2}F) in the presence of ultraviolet radiation.

Ammonia is oxidised by S_{2}F_{10} into NSF_{3}.

== Toxicity ==
S_{2}F_{10} was considered a potential chemical warfare pulmonary agent in World War II because it does not produce lacrimation or skin irritation, thus providing little warning of exposure. Disulfur decafluoride is a colorless gas or liquid with a sulfur dioxide (SO_{2})-like odor. Its toxicity is thought to be caused by its disproportionation in the lungs into SF_{6}, which is inert, and SF_{4}, which reacts with moisture to form sulfurous acid and hydrofluoric acid.

== See also ==
- Phosgene
- Perfluoroisobutene
- Bis(trifluoromethyl) disulfide
