= Nitrogen difluoride =

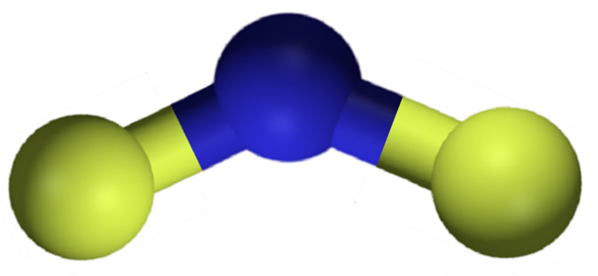

Identifiers
CAS Number	3744-07-8
3D model (JSmol)	Interactive image
ChemSpider	121681
PubChem CID	138039
CompTox Dashboard (EPA)	DTXSID90190888
- InChI: InChI=1S/F2N/c1-3-2 Key: BBZREMAMWBDNHH-UHFFFAOYSA-N
- SMILES: [N](F)F

Properties
Chemical formula	NF_{2}
Molar mass	52.004 g·mol^{−1}

Related compounds
Related nitrogen fluorides	Nitrogen trifluoride; Dinitrogen tetrafluoride; Nitrogen monofluoride
- Except where otherwise noted, data are given for materials in their standard state (at 25 °C [77 °F], 100 kPa). (what is ?) Infobox references

Nitrogen difluoride, also known as difluoroamino, is a reactive radical molecule with formula NF_{2}. This small molecule is in equilibrium with its dimer tetrafluorohydrazine.

N_{2}F_{4} ⇌ 2 NF_{2}

As the temperature increases the proportion of NF_{2} increases.

The molecule is unusual in that it has an odd number of electrons, yet is stable enough to study experimentally.

== Properties ==
The energy needed to break the N–N bond in N_{2}F_{4} is 20.8 kcal/mol (87 kJ/mol), with an entropy change of 38.6 eu. For comparison, the dissociation energy of the N–N bond is 14.6 kcal/mol (61 kJ/mol) in N_{2}O_{4}, 10.2 kcal/mol (43 kJ/mol) in N_{2}O_{2}, and 60 kcal/mol (250 kJ/mol) in N_{2}H_{4}. The enthalpy of formation of N_{2}F_{4} (Δ_{f}H) is 8.227 kcal/mol (34.421 kJ/mol).

At room temperature N_{2}F_{4} is mostly associated with only 0.7% in the form of NF_{2} at 5 mmHg (670 Pa) pressure. When the temperature rises to 225 °C, it mostly dissociates with 99% in the form of NF_{2}.

In NF_{2}, the N–F bond length is 1.3494 Å and the angle subtended at F–N–F is 103.33°.

In the infrared spectrum the N–F bond in NF_{2} has a symmetrical stretching frequency of 1075 cm^{−1}. This compares to 1115 cm^{−1} in NF, 1021 cm^{−1} in NF_{3} and 998 cm^{−1} in N_{2}F_{4}.

The microwave spectrum shows numerous lines due to spin transitions, with or without nuclear spin transitions. The lines form set of two triplets for antisymmetric singlet, or two triplets of triplets for symmetric triplet. Lines appear around 14–15, 24, 25, 26, 27, 28–29, 33, 60, 61, 62, and 65 GHz. The rotational constants for the NF_{2} molecule are A = 70496 MHz, B = 11872.2 MHz, and C = 10136.5 MHz. The inertial defect Δ = 0.1204 m_{u}·Å^{2}. The centrifugal distortion constants are τ_{aaaa} = −7.75, τ_{bbbb} = −0.081, τ_{aabb} = 0.30, and τ_{abab} = −0.13.

The dipole moment is 0.13 D (4.5×10^{−31} C·m).

The ground electronic state of the molecule is ^{2}B_{1}.

The gas is often contaminated with NO or N_{2}O.

== Use ==
Nitrogen difluoride is formed during the function of a xenon monofluoride excimer laser. Nitrogen trifluoride is the halide carrier gas, which releases fluoride ions when impacted by electrons:

NF_{3} + e^{−} → NF_{2} + F^{−}

The free fluoride ion goes on to react with xenon cations.

Nitrogen difluoride can be consumed further to yield nitrogen monofluoride.

NF_{2} + e^{−} → NF + F^{−}

== Extra reading ==
- Goodfriend, P.L.; Woods, H.P. (January 1964). "The absorption spectrum of NF_{2}". Journal of Molecular Spectroscopy. 13 (1–4): 63–66. Bibcode:1964JMoSp..13...63G. doi:10.1016/0022-2852(64)90055-4.
- Jacox, Marilyn E.; Milligan, Dolphus E.; Guillory, William A.; Smith, Jerry J. (August 1974). "Matrix-isolation study of the vacuum-ultraviolet photolysis of NF_{3}". Journal of Molecular Spectroscopy. 52 (2): 322–327. Bibcode:1974JMoSp..52..322J. doi:10.1016/0022-2852(74)90122-2.
- Heidner, R. F.; Helvajian, Henry; Koffend, J. Brooke (August 1987). "Tunable UV laser photolysis of NF_{2}: Quantum yield for NF(a^{1}Δ) production" (PDF). The Journal of Chemical Physics. 87 (3): 1520–1524. Bibcode:1987JChPh..87.1520H. doi:10.1063/1.453262.
- Papakondylis, Aristotle; Mavridis, Aristides (December 1993). "Electronic and geometrical structure of the NF_{2} radical" (PDF). Chemical Physics Letters. 216 (1–2): 167–172. Bibcode:1993CPL...216..167P. doi:10.1016/0009-2614(93)E1254-E.
- Cai, Z.-L.; Sha, G.-H.; Zhang, C.-H.; Huang, M.-B. (March 1991). "Ab initio study of low-lying electronic states of the NF_{2} radical". Chemical Physics Letters. 178 (2–3): 273–278. Bibcode:1991CPL...178..273C. doi:10.1016/0009-2614(91)87068-M.
