= Sulfur chloride pentafluoride =

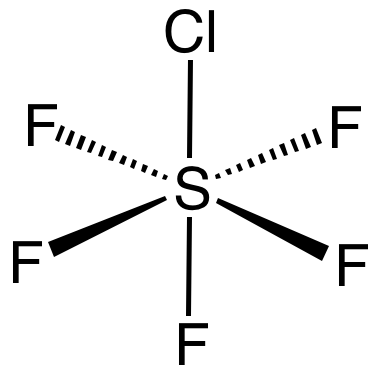

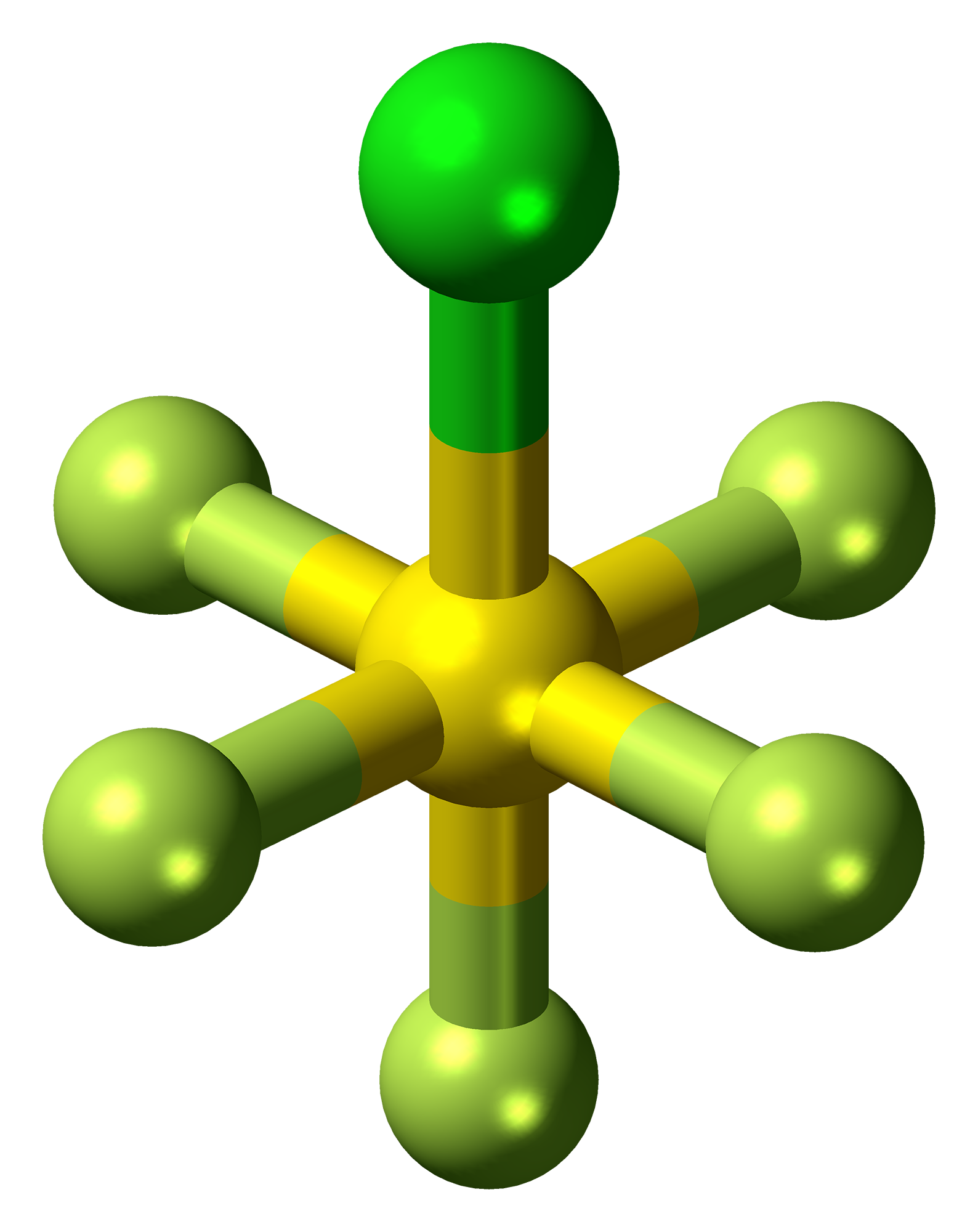

Names
- Other names Pentafluorochlorosulfanyl

Identifiers
CAS Number	13780-57-9
3D model (JSmol)	Interactive image
ChemSpider	109933
ECHA InfoCard	100.034.014
PubChem CID	123330
UNII	T36C2GHD3T
CompTox Dashboard (EPA)	DTXSID60160316
- InChI: InChI=1S/ClF5S/c1-7(2,3,4,5)6 Key: GSYNTTDHMKSMFY-UHFFFAOYSA-N
- SMILES: ClS(F)(F)(F)(F)F

Properties
Chemical formula	SF_{5}Cl
Molar mass	162.510 g/mol
Appearance	Colorless gas
Density	6.642 g/dm^{3}
Melting point	−64 °C (−83 °F; 209 K)
Boiling point	−19 °C (−2 °F; 254 K)

Hazards
- Occupational safety and health (OHS/OSH)
Main hazards	Toxic
- Except where otherwise noted, data are given for materials in their standard state (at 25 °C [77 °F], 100 kPa). (what is ?) Infobox references

Sulfur chloride pentafluoride is an inorganic compound with the formula SF_{5}Cl. It exists as a colorless gas at room temperature and is highly toxic, like most inorganic compounds containing the pentafluorosulfide (–SF_{5}) functional group. The compound adopts an octahedral geometry with C_{4v} symmetry. Sulfur chloride pentafluoride is the only commercially available reagent for adding the –SF_{5} group to organic compounds.

== Reactivity ==
SF_{5}Cl is highly reactive and toxic. In contrast, sulfur hexafluoride (SF_{6}) is inert and nontoxic despite having a closely related chemical formula. This difference highlights the lability of the S–Cl bond in SF_{5}Cl.

Under free-radical conditions, SF_{5}Cl adds across double bonds. The following reaction occurs with propene:

CH_{3}CH=CH_{2} + SF_{5}Cl → CH_{3}CHClCH_{2}SF_{5}

The addition reaction is catalyzed by (CH_{3}CH_{2})_{3}B at around −30 °C. SF_{5}Br is used similarly.

SF_{5}Cl is also a precursor to O(SF_{5})_{2} and F_{2}NSF_{5} (from tetrafluorohydrazine).

== Synthesis ==
Sulfur chloropentafluoride can be synthesized by several routes, starting from two lower sulfur fluorides, sulfur tetrafluoride and disulfur decafluoride:

SF_{4} + Cl_{2} + CsF → SF_{5}Cl + CsCl
ClF + SF_{4} → SF_{5}Cl
S_{2}F_{10} + Cl_{2} → 2 SF_{5}Cl

The corresponding SF_{5}Br is prepared similarly from in-situ generated bromine monofluoride.
