= Nitrogen monofluoride =

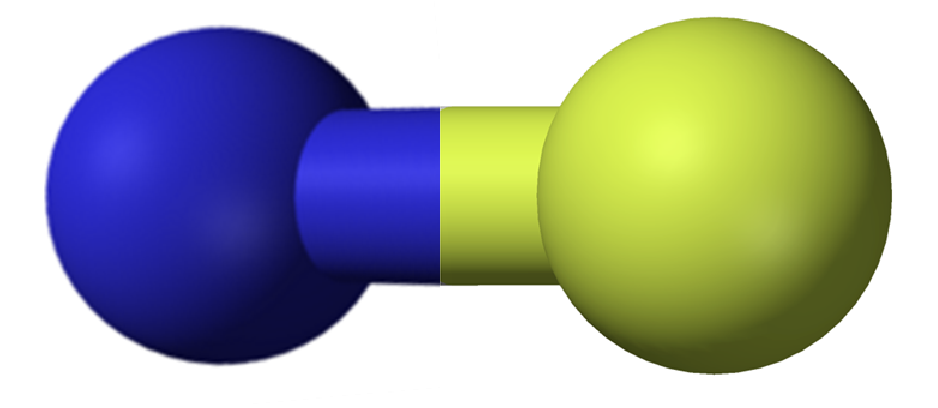

Names
- Other names Fluoroimidogen

Identifiers
CAS Number	13967-06-1
3D model (JSmol)	Interactive image
PubChem CID	134980272
CompTox Dashboard (EPA)	DTXSID201316478
- InChI: InChI=1S/FN/c1-2 Key: CMUBZTZNXGBJMQ-UHFFFAOYSA-N
- SMILES: [F+]=[N-]

Properties
Chemical formula	FN
Molar mass	33.005 g·mol^{−1}

Related compounds
Related isoelectronic	Dioxygen, nitroxyl anion
- Except where otherwise noted, data are given for materials in their standard state (at 25 °C [77 °F], 100 kPa). Infobox references

Nitrogen monofluoride (fluoroimidogen) is a metastable species that has been observed in laser studies. It is isoelectronic with O_{2}. Like boron monofluoride, it is an instance of the rare multiply-bonded fluorine atom. It is unstable with respect to its formal dimer, dinitrogen difluoride, as well as to its elements, nitrogen and fluorine.

Nitrogen monofluoride is produced when radical species (H, O, N, CH_{3}) abstracts a fluorine atom from nitrogen difluoride (NF_{2}). Stoichiometrically, the reaction is extremely efficient, regenerating a radical for long-lasting chain propagation. However, radical impurities in the end product also catalyze that product's decomposition. Azide decomposition offers a less-efficient but more pure technique: fluorine azide (which can be formed in situ via reaction of atomic fluorine with hydrazoic acid) decomposes upon shock into NF and N_{2}.

Many NF-producing reactions give the product in an excited state with characteristic chemiluminescence at 870 and 875 nm (infrared), or at 525–530 nm (green). They have thus been investigated for development as a chemical laser.
