= Entropy unit =

Unit of energy per mole per temperature

The entropy unit is a non-S.I. unit of thermodynamic entropy, usually denoted by "e.u." or "eU" and equal to one calorie per kelvin per mole, or 4.184 joules per kelvin per mole. Entropy units are primarily used in chemistry to describe enthalpy changes.
