= Tetrafluorohydrazine =

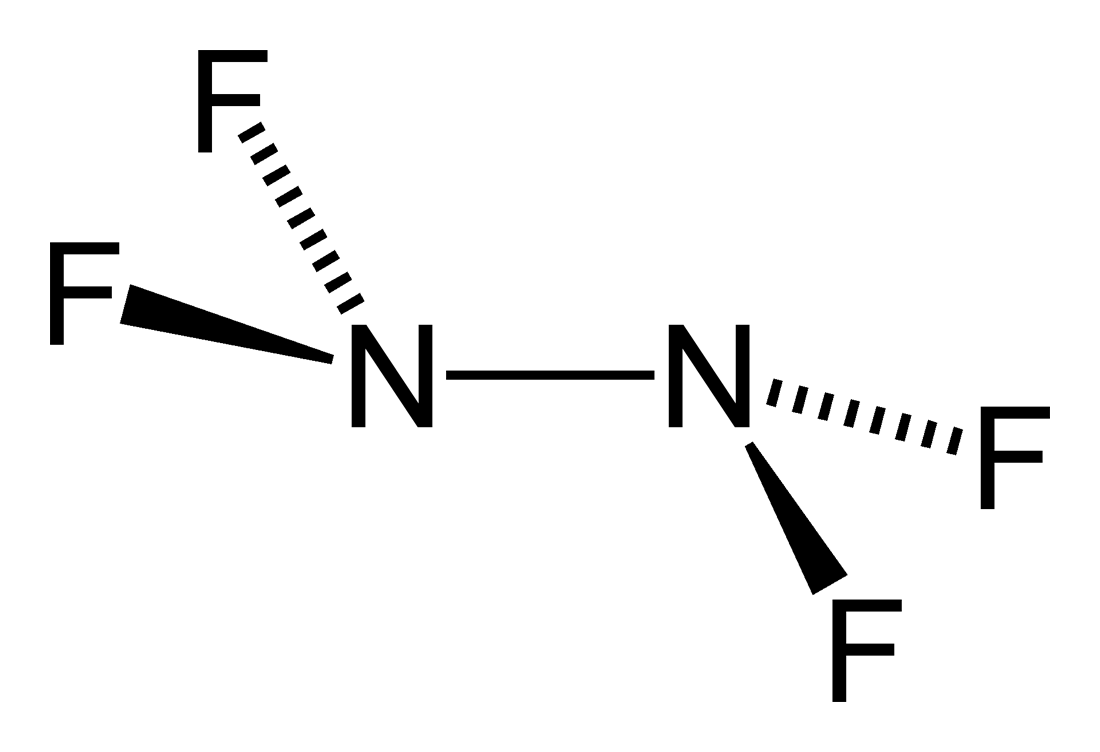

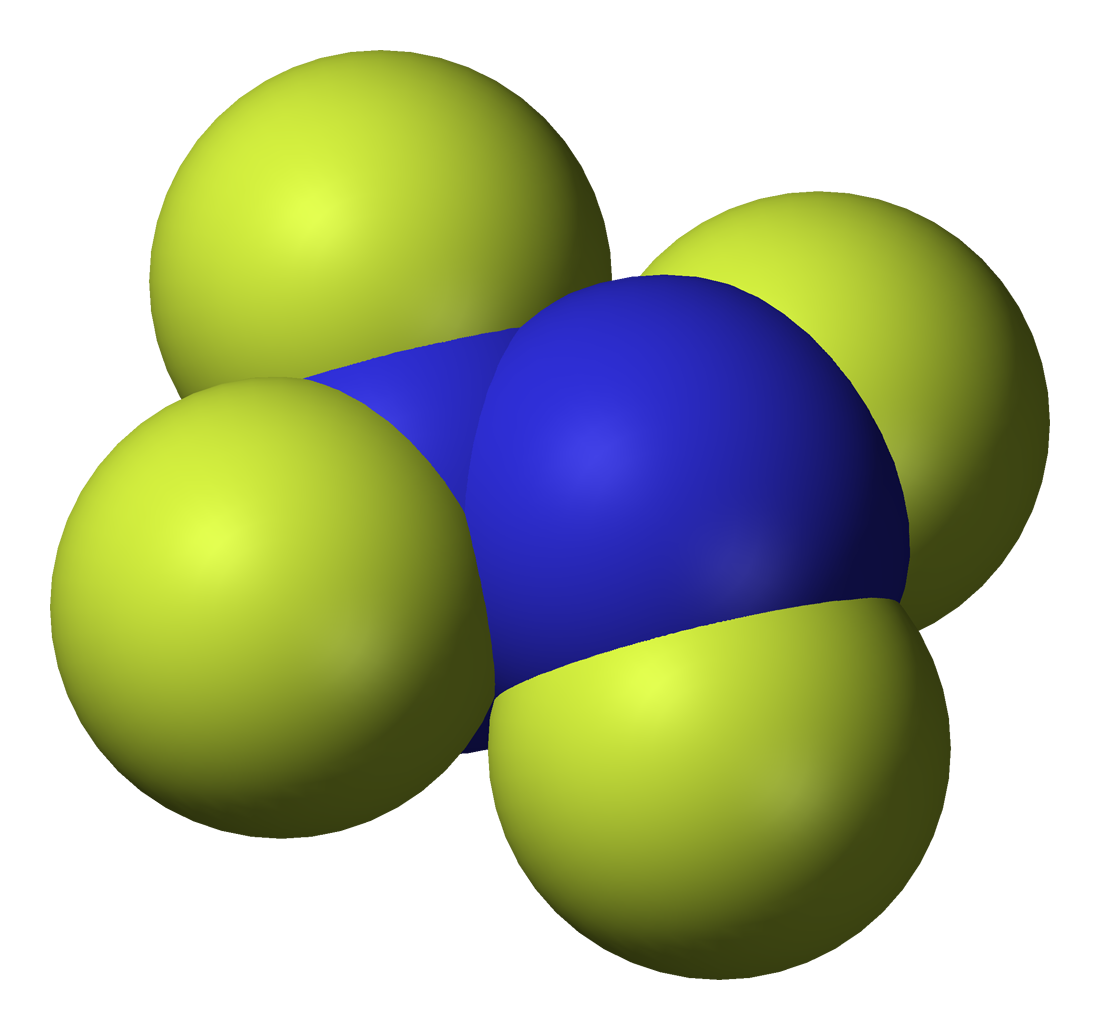

Names
- IUPAC name 1,1,2,2-tetrafluorohydrazine
- Other names Tetrafluorohydrazine, perfluorohydrazine, UN 1955

Identifiers
| CAS Number | 10036-47-2 |
| 3D model (JSmol) | Interactive image |
| ChemSpider | 23228 |
| ECHA InfoCard | 100.030.091 |
| PubChem CID | 24845 |
| UNII | RR3J2QP9MG |
| CompTox Dashboard (EPA) | DTXSID9064922 |
- InChI: InChI=1S/F4N2/c1-5(2)6(3)4 Key: GFADZIUESKAXAK-UHFFFAOYSA-N; InChI=1/F4N2/c1; InChI=1/F4N2/c1-5(2)6(3)4 Key: GFADZIUESKAXAK-UHFFFAOYAX
- SMILES: FN(F)N(F)F

Properties
| Chemical formula | N_{2}F_{4} |
| Molar mass | 104.008 g·mol^{−1} |
| Appearance | Colourless gas |
| Melting point | −164.5 °C (−264.1 °F; 108.6 K) |
| Boiling point | −73 °C (−99 °F; 200 K) |

Hazards
- Occupational safety and health (OHS/OSH)
| Main hazards | Explosion |
- Lethal dose or concentration (LD, LC)
| LD_{50} (median dose) | 10 mL/kg (rat, intraperitoneal) |
| LC_{50} (median concentration) | 440 mg/m3 (mouse, inhalation); 900 ppm/1H (guinea pig, inhalation) |
- Except where otherwise noted, data are given for materials in their standard state (at 25 °C [77 °F], 100 kPa). verify (what is ?) Infobox references

Tetrafluorohydrazine or perfluorohydrazine, N_{2}F_{4}, is a colourless, nonflammable, reactive inorganic gas. It is a fluorinated analog of hydrazine.

== Synthesis ==
Tetrafluorohydrazine was originally prepared from nitrogen trifluoride using a copper atom as a fluorine atom acceptor:

2NF_{3} + Cu → N_{2}F_{4} + CuF_{2}

A number of F-atom acceptors can be used, including carbon, other metals, and nitric oxide. These reactions exploit the relatively weak N-F bond in NF_{3}.

== Properties ==
Tetrafluorohydrazine is in equilibrium with its radical monomer nitrogen difluoride.

N_{2}F_{4} ⇌ 2 •NF_{2}

At room temperature N_{2}F_{4} is mostly associated with only 0.7% in the form of NF_{2} at 5mm Hg pressure. When the temperature rises to 225 °C, it mostly dissociates with 99% in the form of NF_{2}.

The energy needed to break the N−N bond in N_{2}F_{4} is 20.8 kcal/mol, with an entropy change of 38.6 eu. For comparison, the dissociation energy of the N−N bond is 14.6 kcal/mol (61 kJ/mol) in N_{2}O_{4}, 10.2 kcal/mol (43 kJ/mol) in N_{2}O_{2}, and 60 kcal/mol (250 kJ/mol) in N_{2}H_{4}. The enthalpy of formation of N_{2}F_{4} (Δ_{f}H°) is 34.421 kJ/mol.

== Uses ==
Tetrafluorohydrazine is used in organic synthesis and some experimental rocket propellant formulations. It adds across double bonds to give vicinal di(difluoroamine)s. In chemical syntheses, as a precursor or a catalyst. It was considered for use as a high-energy liquid oxidizer in some never-flown rocket propellant formulas in 1959.

== Safety ==
Tetrafluorohydrazine is a highly hazardous chemical that explodes in the presence of organic materials.

It is a toxic chemical which irritates skin, eyes and lungs. It is a neurotoxin and may cause methemoglobinemia. It may be fatal if inhaled or absorbed through skin. Vapors may be irritating and corrosive. It is a strong oxidizing agent. Contact with this chemical may cause burns and severe injury. Fire produces irritating, corrosive and toxic gases. Vapors from liquefied gas are initially heavier than air and spread across the ground.

Tetrafluorohydrazine explodes or ignites on contact with reducing agents at room temperature, including hydrogen, hydrocarbons, alcohols, thiols, amines, ammonia, hydrazines, dicyanogen, nitroalkanes, alkylberylliums, silanes, boranes or powdered metals. Prolonged exposure of the container of tetrafluorohydrazine to high heat may cause it to rupture violently and rocket. Tetrafluorohydrazine itself can explode at high temperatures or with shock or blast when under pressure. When heated to decomposition in air, it emits highly toxic fumes of fluorine and oxides of nitrogen.

There is a fatal case in which during opening of valves to check the pressure, the cylinder exploded, killing one man and injuring another.
