= Nitrogen trifluoride =

Chemical compound

- Nitrogen trifluoride

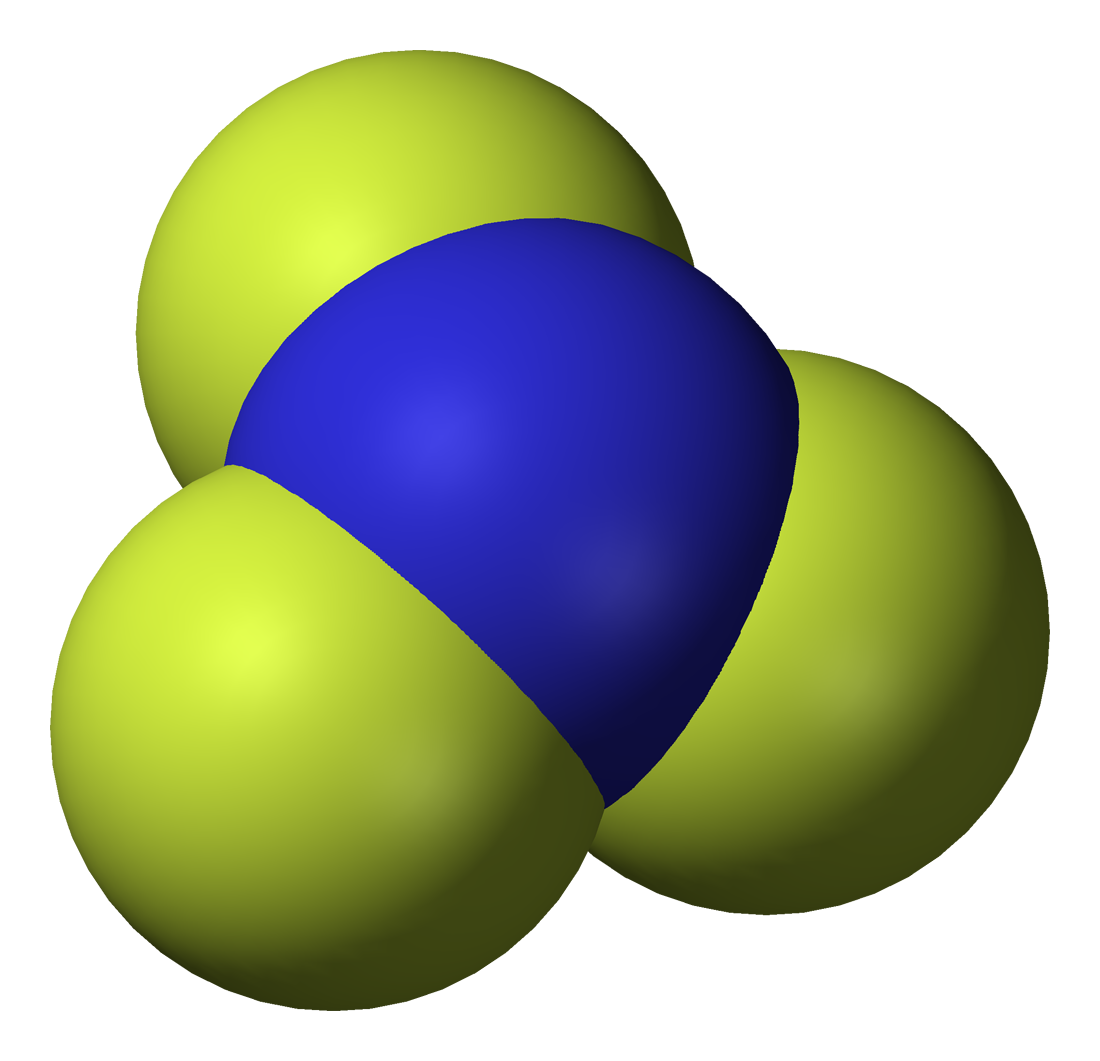
- Nitrogen trifluoride

Names
- IUPAC name Nitrogen trifluoride
- Other names Nitrogen fluoride Trifluoramine; Trifluorammonia

Identifiers
| CAS Number | 7783-54-2 |
| 3D model (JSmol) | Interactive image |
| ChEBI | CHEBI:30231 |
| ChemSpider | 22959 |
| ECHA InfoCard | 100.029.097 |
| EC Number | 232-007-1 |
| Gmelin Reference | 1551 |
| PubChem CID | 24553 |
| RTECS number | QX1925000 |
| UNII | 4402F4X0RH |
| UN number | 2451 |
| CompTox Dashboard (EPA) | DTXSID4040181 |
- InChI: InChI=1S/F3N/c1-4(2)3 Key: GVGCUCJTUSOZKP-UHFFFAOYSA-N; InChI=1/F3N/c1-4(2)3 Key: GVGCUCJTUSOZKP-UHFFFAOYAA
- SMILES: FN(F)F

Properties
| Chemical formula | NF_{3} |
| Molar mass | 71.00 g/mol |
| Appearance | colorless gas |
| Odor | moldy |
| Density | 3.003 kg/m^{3} (1 atm, 15 °C); 1.885 g/cm^{3} (liquid at b.p.) |
| Melting point | −207.15 °C (−340.87 °F; 66.00 K) |
| Boiling point | −129.06 °C (−200.31 °F; 144.09 K) |
| Solubility in water | 0.021 g/100 mL |
| Vapor pressure | 44.0 atm(−38.5 °F or −39.2 °C or 234.0 K) (Note: This vapour pressure is the pressure at its critical temperature – below ordinary room temperature.) |
| Refractive index (n_{D}) | 1.0004 |

Structure
| Molecular shape | trigonal pyramidal |
| Dipole moment | 0.234 D |

Thermochemistry
| Heat capacity (C) | 53.26 J/(mol·K) |
| Std molar entropy (S^{⦵}_{298}) | 260.3 J/(mol·K) |
| Std enthalpy of formation (Δ_{f}H^{⦵}_{298}) | −31.4 kcal/mol −109 kJ/mol |
| Gibbs free energy (Δ_{f}G^{⦵}) | −84.4 kJ/mol |

Hazards
- GHS labelling
| Pictograms | (GHS03: Oxidizing) (GHS04: Compressed Gas) (GHS07: Exclamation mark) |
| Hazard statements | H270, H280, H332, H373 |
| Precautionary statements | P220, P244, P260, P304+P340, P315, P370+P376, P403 |
| NFPA 704 (fire diamond) | 1 0 0 OX |
| Flash point | Non-flammable |
- Lethal dose or concentration (LD, LC)
| LC_{50} (median concentration) | 2000 ppm (mouse, 4 h); 9600 ppm (dog, 1 h); 7500 ppm (monkey, 1 h); 6700 ppm (rat, 1 h); 7500 ppm (mouse, 1 h) |
- NIOSH (US health exposure limits)
| PEL (Permissible) | TWA 10 ppm (29 mg/m^{3}) |
| REL (Recommended) | TWA 10 ppm (29 mg/m^{3}) |
| IDLH (Immediate danger) | 1000 ppm |
| Safety data sheet (SDS) | AirLiquide |

Related compounds
| Other anions | nitrogen trichloride nitrogen tribromide nitrogen triiodide ammonia |
| Other cations | phosphorus trifluoride arsenic trifluoride antimony trifluoride bismuth trifluoride |
| Related binary fluoro-azanes | tetrafluorohydrazine |
| Related compounds | dinitrogen difluoride |
- Except where otherwise noted, data are given for materials in their standard state (at 25 °C [77 °F], 100 kPa). verify (what is ?) Infobox references

Nitrogen trifluoride is the inorganic compound with the formula (NF_{3}). It is a colorless, non-flammable, toxic gas with a slightly musty odor. In contrast with ammonia, it is nonbasic. It finds increasing use within the manufacturing of flat-panel displays, photovoltaics, LEDs and other microelectronics. NF_{3} is a greenhouse gas, with a global warming potential (GWP) 17,200 times greater than that of CO_{2} when compared over a 100-year period.

== Synthesis and reactivity ==
Nitrogen trifluoride can be prepared from the elements in the presence of an electric discharge. In 1903, Otto Ruff prepared nitrogen trifluoride by the electrolysis of a molten mixture of ammonium fluoride and hydrogen fluoride. It is far less reactive than the other nitrogen trihalides nitrogen trichloride, nitrogen tribromide, and nitrogen triiodide, all of which are explosive. Alone among the nitrogen trihalides it has a negative enthalpy of formation. It is prepared in modern times both by direct reaction of ammonia and fluorine and by a variation of Ruff's method. It is supplied in pressurized cylinders.

NF_{3} is slightly soluble in water without undergoing chemical reaction. It is nonbasic with a low dipole moment of 0.2340 D. By contrast, ammonia is basic and highly polar (1.47 D). This contrast reflects the differing electronegativities of H vs F.

Similar to dioxygen, NF_{3} is a potent yet sluggish oxidizer. It oxidizes hydrogen chloride to chlorine:

2 NF_{3} + 6 HCl → 6 HF + N_{2} + 3 Cl_{2}

However, it only attacks (explosively) organic compounds at high temperatures. Consequently it is compatible under standard conditions with several plastics, as well as steel and Monel.

Above 200-300 °C, NF_{3} reacts with metals, carbon, and other reagents to give tetrafluorohydrazine:

2NF_{3} + Cu → N_{2}F_{4} + CuF_{2}

NF_{3} reacts with fluorine and antimony pentafluoride to give the tetrafluoroammonium salt:

NF_{3} + F_{2} + SbF_{5} → NF^{+}_{4}SbF^{−}_{6}

NF_{3} and B_{2}H_{6} react vigorously even at cryogenic temperatures to give nitrogen gas, boron trifluoride, and hydrofluoric acid. NF_{3} can also form stable adduct ions with cations of noble gases, especially Kr^{+} and Xe^{+}.

== Applications ==
High-volume applications such as DRAM computer memory production, the manufacturing of flat panel displays and the large-scale production of thin-film solar cells use NF_{3}.

=== Etching ===
Nitrogen trifluoride is primarily used to remove silicon and silicon-compounds during the manufacturing of semiconductor devices such as LCDs, some thin-film solar cells, and other microelectronics. In these applications NF_{3} is initially broken down within a plasma. The resulting fluorine radicals are the active agents that attack polysilicon, silicon nitride and silicon oxide. They can be used as well to remove tungsten silicide, tungsten, and certain other metals. In addition to serving as an etchant in device fabrication, NF_{3} is also widely used to clean PECVD chambers.

NF_{3} dissociates more readily within a low-pressure discharge in comparison to perfluorinated compounds (PFCs) and sulfur hexafluoride (SF_{6}). The greater abundance of negatively-charged free radicals thus generated can yield higher silicon removal rates, and provide other process benefits such as less residual contamination and a lower net charge stress on the device being fabricated. As a somewhat more thoroughly consumed etching and cleaning agent, NF_{3} has also been promoted as an environmentally preferable substitute for SF_{6} or PFCs such as hexafluoroethane.

The utilization efficiency of the chemicals applied in plasma processes varies widely between equipment and applications. A sizeable fraction of the reactants are wasted into the exhaust stream and can ultimately be emitted into Earth's atmosphere. Modern abatement systems can substantially decrease atmospheric emissions. NF_{3} has not been subject to significant use restrictions. The annual reporting of NF_{3} production, consumption, and waste emissions by large manufacturers has been required in many industrialized countries as a response to the observed atmospheric growth and the international Kyoto Protocol.

Highly toxic fluorine gas (F_{2}, diatomic fluorine) is a climate neutral replacement for nitrogen trifluoride in some manufacturing applications. It requires more stringent handling and safety precautions, especially to protect manufacturing personnel.

Nitrogen trifluoride is also used in hydrogen fluoride and deuterium fluoride lasers, which are types of chemical lasers. There it is also preferred to fluorine gas due to its more convenient handling properties

== Greenhouse gas ==
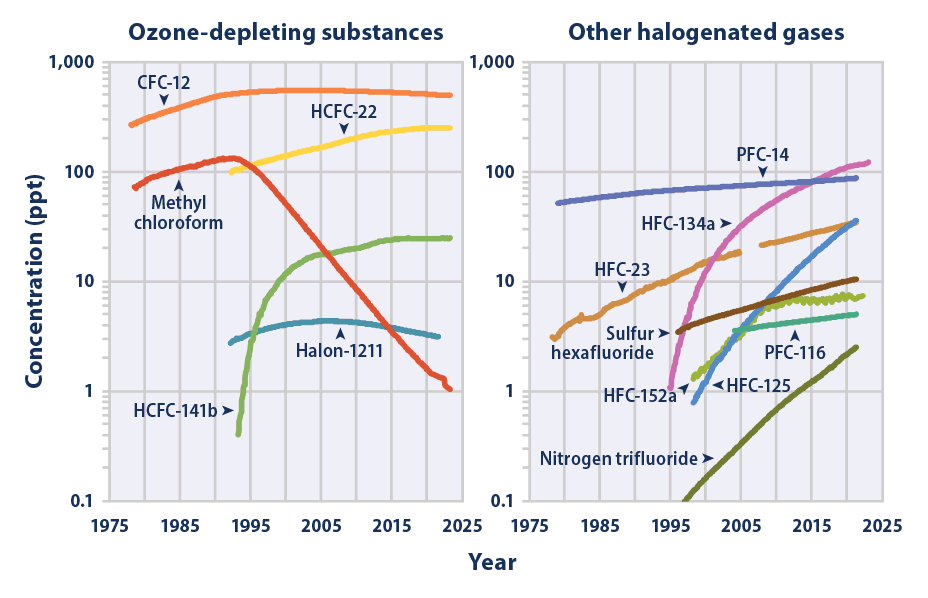
Growth in atmospheric concentration of NF_{3} since the 1990s is shown in right graph, along with a subset of similar man-made gases. Note the log scale.

The GWP of NF_{3} is second only to SF_{6} in the group of Kyoto-recognised greenhouse gases, and NF_{3} was included in that grouping with effect from 2013 and the commencement of the second commitment period of the Kyoto Protocol. It has an estimated atmospheric lifetime of 740 years, although other work suggests a slightly shorter lifetime of 550 years (and a corresponding GWP of 16,800).

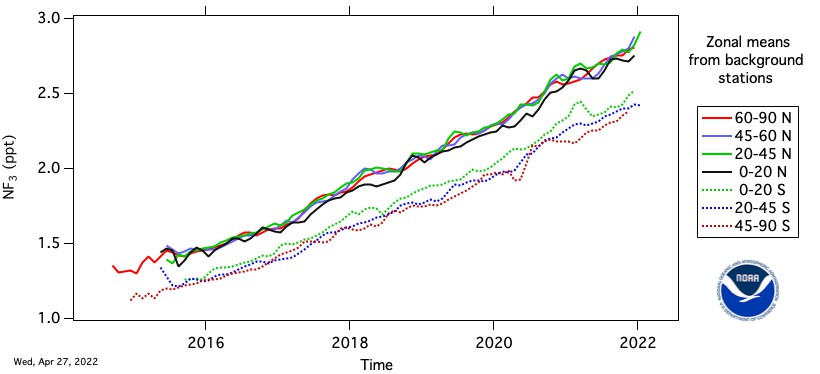
Nitrogen trifluoride concentration at several latitudes since 2015.

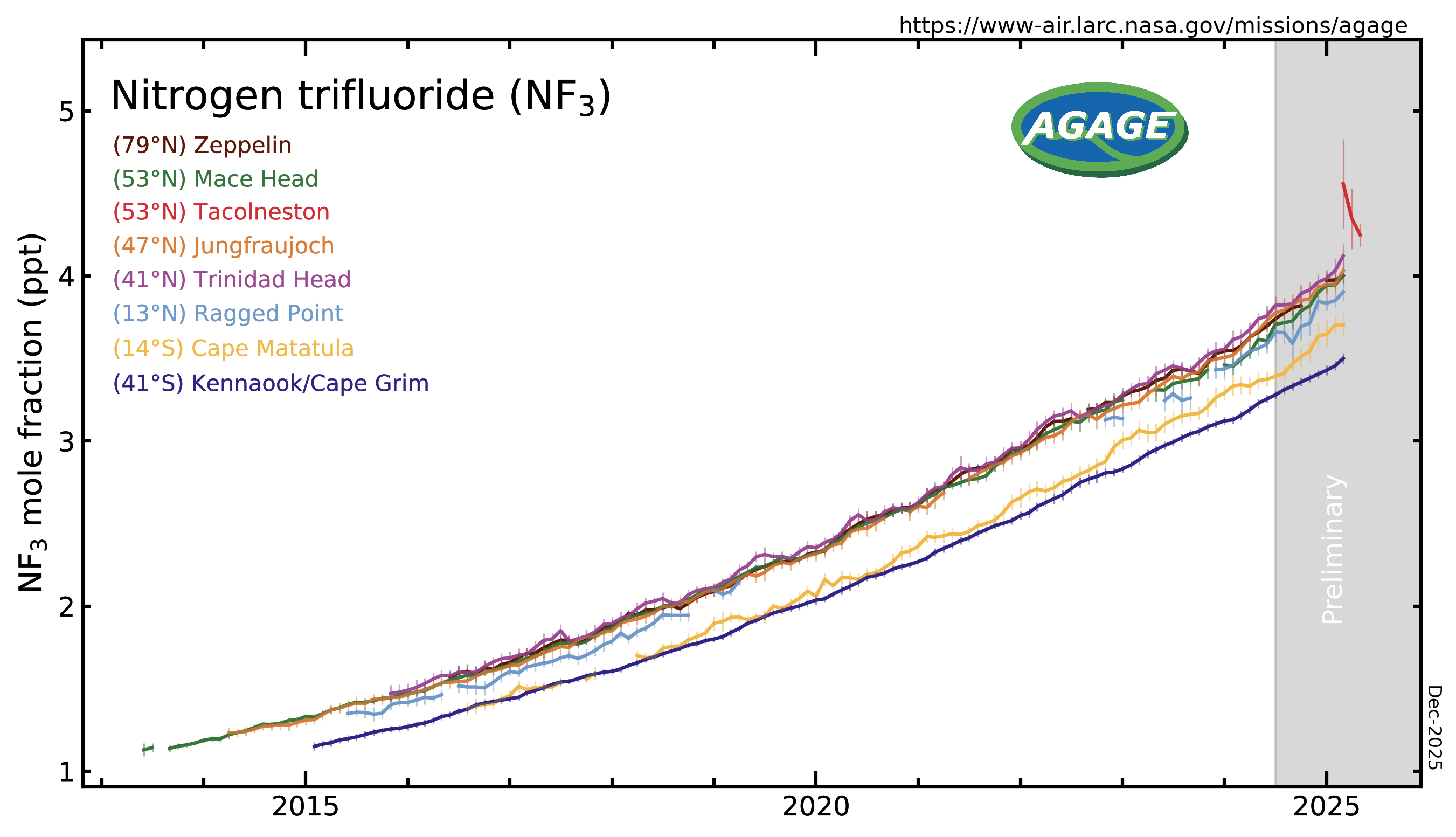
NF3 measured by the Advanced Global Atmospheric Gases Experiment (AGAGE) in the lower atmosphere (troposphere) at stations around the world. Abundances are given as pollution free monthly mean mole fractions in parts-per-trillion.

Since 1992, when less than 100 tons were produced, production grew to an estimated 4000 tons in 2007 and is projected to increase significantly. World production of NF_{3} is expected to reach 8000 tons a year by 2010. By far the world's largest producer of NF_{3} is the US industrial gas and chemical company Air Products & Chemicals. An estimated 2% of produced NF_{3} is released into the atmosphere. Robson projected that the maximum atmospheric concentration is less than 0.16 parts per trillion (ppt) by volume, which will provide less than 0.001 Wm^{−2} of IR forcing. The mean global tropospheric concentration of NF_{3} has risen from about 0.02 ppt (parts per trillion, dry air mole fraction) in 1980, to 0.86 ppt in 2011, with a rate of increase of 0.095 ppt yr^{−1}, or about 11% per year, and an interhemispheric gradient that is consistent with emissions occurring overwhelmingly in the Northern Hemisphere, as expected. This rise rate in 2011 corresponds to about 1200 metric tons/y NF_{3} emissions globally, or about 10% of the NF_{3} global production estimates. This is a significantly higher percentage than has been estimated by industry, and thus strengthens the case for inventorying NF_{3} production and for regulating its emissions. One study co-authored by industry representatives suggests that the contribution of the NF_{3} emissions to the overall greenhouse gas budget of thin-film Si-solar cell manufacturing is clear.

The UNFCCC, within the context of the Kyoto Protocol, decided to include nitrogen trifluoride in the second Kyoto Protocol compliance period, which begins in 2012 and ends in either 2017 or 2020. Following suit, the WBCSD/WRI GHG Protocol is amending all of its standards (corporate, product and Scope 3) to also cover NF_{3}.

== Safety ==
Skin contact with NF_{3} is not hazardous, and it is a relatively minor irritant to mucous membranes and eyes. It is a pulmonary irritant with a toxicity considerably lower than nitrogen oxides, and overexposure via inhalation causes the conversion of hemoglobin in blood to methemoglobin, which can lead to the condition methemoglobinemia. The National Institute for Occupational Safety and Health (NIOSH) specifies that the concentration that is immediately dangerous to life or health (IDLH value) is 1,000 ppm.

== See also ==
- IPCC list of greenhouse gases
- Nitrogen pentafluoride
- Tetrafluorohydrazine
