= History of materials science =

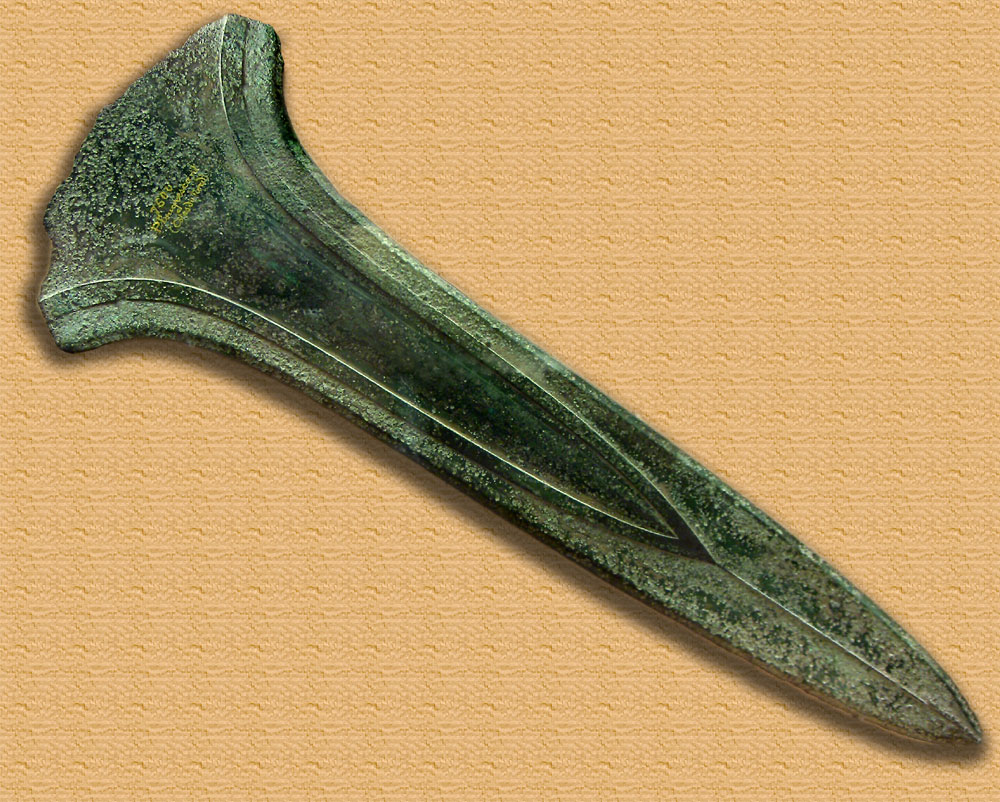
Short sword or dagger, Bronze age, around 800 BCE?

materials science and engineering has shaped the development of civilizations since the dawn of humankind. Better materials for tools and weapons has allowed people to spread and conquer, and advancements in material processing like steel and aluminum production continue to impact society today. Historians have regarded materials as such an important aspect of civilizations such that entire periods of time have defined by the predominant material used (Stone Age, Bronze Age, Iron Age). For most of recorded history, control of materials had been through alchemy or empirical means at best. The study and development of chemistry and physics assisted the study of materials, and eventually the interdisciplinary study of materials science emerged from the fusion of these studies. The history of materials science is the study of how different materials were used and developed through the history of Earth and how those materials affected the culture of the peoples of the Earth. The term "Silicon Age" is sometimes used to refer to the modern period of history during the late 20th to early 21st centuries.

== Prehistory ==
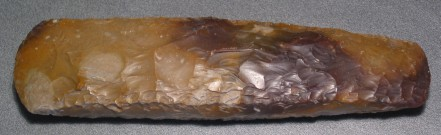
Flint axe, about 31 cm long.

In many cases, different cultures leave their materials as the only records; which anthropologists can use to define the existence of such cultures. The progressive use of more sophisticated materials allows archeologists to characterize and distinguish between peoples. This is partially due to the major material of use in a culture and to its associated benefits and drawbacks. Stone-Age cultures were limited by which rocks they could find locally and by which they could acquire by trading. The use of flint around 300,000 BCE is sometimes considered the beginning of the use of ceramics. The use of polished stone axes marks a significant advance, because a much wider variety of rocks could serve as tools.

The innovation of smelting and casting metals in the Bronze Age started to change the way that cultures developed and interacted with each other. Starting around 5,500 BCE, early smiths began to re-shape native metals of copper and gold, without the use of fire and by using tools and weapons. The heating of copper and its shaping with hammers began around 5,000 BCE. Melting and casting started around 4,000 BCE. Metallurgy had its dawn with the reduction of copper from its ore around 3,500 BCE. The first alloy, bronze came into use around 3,000 BCE.

=== Stone Age ===
The use of materials began in the Stone Age. Typically, materials such as bone, fibers, feathers, shells, animal skin, and clay were used for weapons, tools, jewelry, and shelter. The earliest tools were in the Paleolithic age, called Oldowan. These were tools created from chipped rocks that would be used for scavenging purpose. As history carried on into the Mesolithic age, tools became more complex and symmetrical in design with sharper edges. Moving into the Neolithic age, agriculture began to develop as new ways to form tools for farming were discovered. Nearing the end of the Stone Age, humans began using copper, gold, and silver as a material. Due to these metals' softness, the general use was for ceremonial purposes and to create ornaments or decorations and did not replace other materials for use in tools. The simplicity of the tools used reflected on the simple understanding of the human species of the time.

=== Bronze Age ===
The use of copper had become very apparent to civilizations, such as its properties of elasticity and plasticity that allow it to be hammered into useful shapes, along with its ability to be melted and poured into intricate shapes. Although, the advantages of copper were many, the material was too soft to find large scale usefulness. Through experimentation or by chance, additions to copper lead to increased hardness of a new metal alloy, called bronze. Bronze was originally composed of copper and arsenic, forming arsenic bronze.

=== Iron Age ===
Iron working came into prominence from about 1,200 BCE. In the 10th century BCE, glass production began in ancient Near East. In the 3rd century BCE, people in ancient India developed wootz steel, the first crucible steel. In the 1st century BCE, glassblowing techniques flourished in Phoenicia. In the 2nd century, CE steel-making became widespread in Han dynasty China. The 4th century CE saw the production of the Iron pillar of Delhi, the oldest surviving example of corrosion-resistant steel.

== Antiquity ==
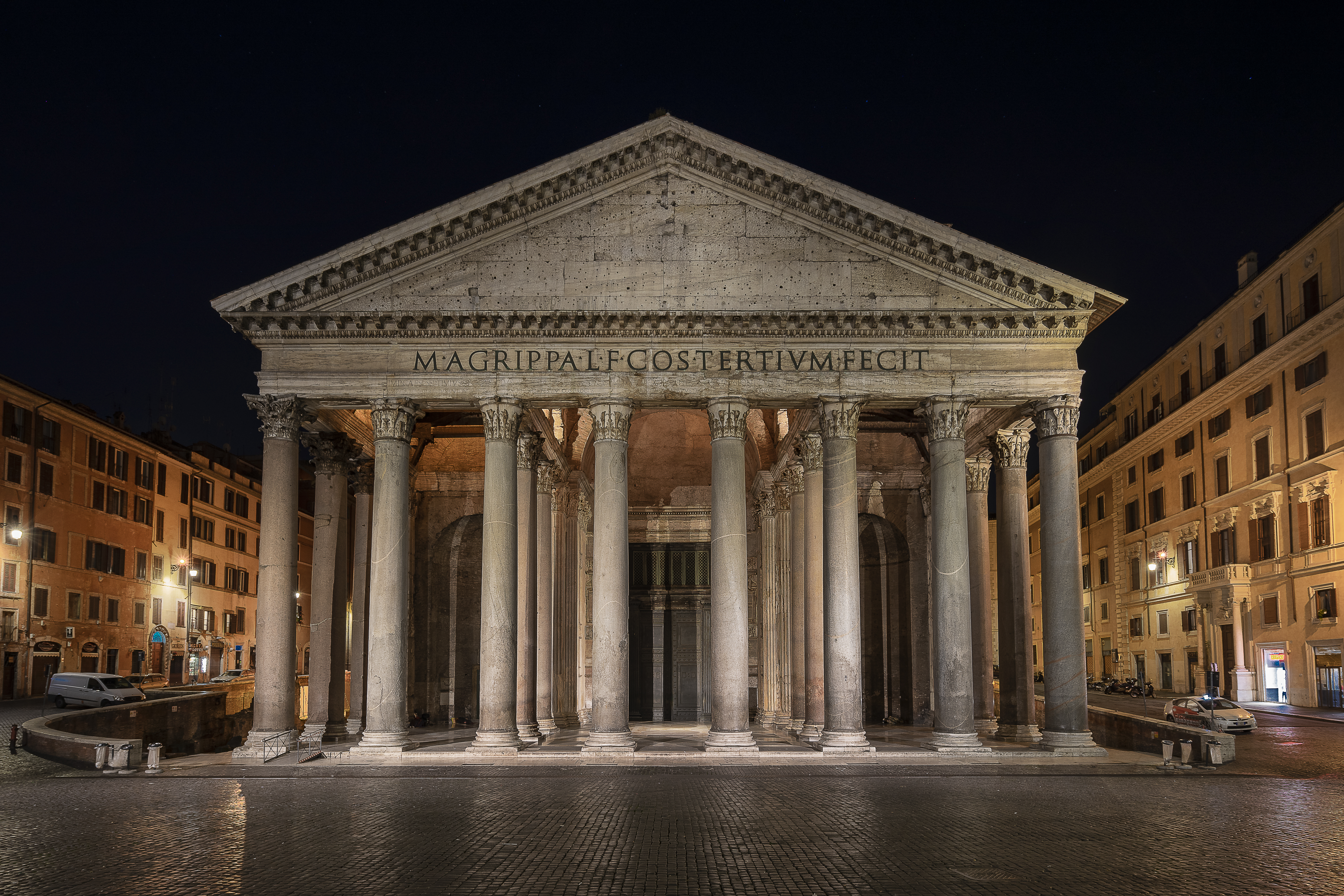
The Pantheon in Rome.

Wood, bone, stone, and earth are some of the materials, which formed the structures of the Roman Empire. Certain structures were made possible by the character of the land upon which these structures are built. Romans mixed powdered limestone, volcanic ash found from Mount Vesuvius, and water to make a cement paste. A volcanic peninsula with stone aggregates and conglomerates containing crystalline material will produce material, which weathers differently from soft, sedimentary rock and silt. With the discovery of cement paste, structures could be built with irregular shaped stones and have the binder fill the voids to create a solid structure. The cement gains strength as it hydrates, thus creating a stronger bond over time. With the fall of the west Roman Empire and the rise of the Byzans, this knowledge was mostly lost except to the catholic monks, who were among the few who could read Vitruvius’ Latin and make use of the concrete paste. That is one of the reasons that the concrete Pantheon of Rome could last for 1,850 years, and why the thatched farmhouses of Holland sketched by Rembrandt have long since decayed.

The use of asbestos as a material blossomed in Ancient Greece, especially when the fireproofing qualities of the material came to light. Many scholars believe the word asbestos comes from an Ancient Greek term, ἄσβεστος (ásbestos), meaning "inextinguishable" or "unquenchable". Clothes for nobles, table clothes and other oven adornments were all furnished with a weave of the fibrous materials, as the materials could be cleansed by throwing them directly into fire. The use of this material however was not without its downsides, Pliny the Elder, noted a link between the quick death of slaves to work in the asbestos mine. He recommended that slaves working in this environment use the a bladder skin as a makeshift respirator.

After the thighbone daggers of the early hunter-gatherers were superseded by wood and stone axes, and then by copper, bronze and iron implements of the Roman civilization, more precious materials could then be sought, and gathered together. Thus the medieval goldsmith Benvenuto Cellini could seek and defend the gold which he had to turn into objects of desire for dukes and popes. The Autobiography of Benvenuto Cellini contains one of the first descriptions of a metallurgical process.

The use of cork, which has been recently added to the category of materials science, had its first mentions beginning with Horace, Pliny, and Plutarch. It had many uses in antiquity including in fishing and safety devices because of its buoyancy, an engraving medium, sandal soles to increase stature, container stoppers, and being an insulator. It was also used to help cure baldness in the second century.

In the Ancient Roman Era, glassblowing became an art involving the additions of decor and tints. They were also able to created complex shapes due to the use of a mold. This technology allowed them to imitate gemstones. Window glass was formed by casting into flat clay molds then removed and cleaned. The texture in stained glass comes from the texture the sand mold left on the side in contact with the mold.

Polymeric composites also made an appearance during this time frame in the form of wood. By 80 BC, petrified resin and keratin were used in accessories as amber and tortoise shell respectively.

In Alexandria in the first century BC, glass blowing was developed in part due to new furnaces that could create higher temperatures by using a clay coated reed pipe. Plant ash and natron glass, the latter being the primary component, were used in blown pieces. Coastal and semi desert plants worked best due to their low magnesium oxide and potassium oxide content. The Levant, North Africa, and Italy were where blown glass vessels were most common.

== Middle Ages ==
Proto-porcelain material has been discovered dating back to the Neolithic period, with shards of material found in archaeological sites from the Eastern Han period in China. These wares are estimated to have been fired from 1260 °C to 1300 °C. In the 8th century, porcelain was invented in Tang dynasty, China. Porcelain in china resulted in a methodical development of widely used kilns that increased the quality and quantity that porcelain could be produced. Tin-glazing of ceramics is invented by Arabic chemists and potters in Basra, Iraq.

During the Early Middle Ages, the technique of creating windows steered more towards glass blowing non-tinted balls that were later flattened, but then in the late Middle Ages; the methodology returned to that from antiquity with a few minor adjustments, which included rolling with metallic rollers.

In the 9th century, stonepaste ceramics were invented in Iraq, and lustreware appeared in Mesopotamia. In the 11th century, Damascus steel is developed in the Middle East. In the 15th century, Johann Gutenberg develops type metal alloy and Angelo Barovier invents cristallo, a clear soda-based glass.

== Early modern period ==
In 1540, Vannoccio Biringuccio publishes his De la pirotechnia, the first systematic book on metallurgy, in 1556 Georg Agricola writes De Re Metallica, an influential book on metallurgy and mining, and glass lens are developed in the Netherlands and used for the first time in microscopes and telescopes.

In the 17th century, Galileo's Two New Sciences (strength of materials and kinematics) includes the first quantitative statements in the science of materials.

In the 18th century, William Champion patents a process for the production of metallic zinc by distillation from calamine and charcoal, Bryan Higgins was issued a patent for hydraulic cement (stucco) for use as an exterior plaster, and Alessandro Volta makes a copper or zinc acid battery.

In the 19th century, Thomas Johann Seebeck invents the thermocouple, Joseph Aspin invents Portland cement, Charles Goodyear invents vulcanized rubber, Louis Daguerre and William Fox Talbot invent silver-based photographic processes, James Clerk Maxwell demonstrates color photography, and Charles Fritts makes the first solar cells using selenium waffles.

Before the early 1800s, aluminum had not been produced as an isolated metal. It wasn't until 1825 that; Hans Christian Ørsted discovered how to create elemental aluminum via the reduction of aluminum chloride. Since aluminum is a light element with good mechanical properties, it was widely sought to replace heavier less functional metals like silver and gold. Napoleon III used aluminum plates and utensils for his honored guests, while the rest were given silver. However, this process was still expensive and was still not able to produce the metal in large quantities.

In 1886, American Charles Martin Hall and Frenchman Paul Héroult invented a process completely independent of each other to produce aluminum from aluminum oxide via electrolysis. This process would allow aluminum to be manufactured cheaper than ever before, and laid the groundwork for turning the element from a precious metal into an easily obtainable commodity. Around the same time in 1888, Carl Josef Bayer was working in St Petersburg, Russia to develop a method to make pure alumina for the textile industry. This process involved dissolving the aluminum oxide out of the bauxite mineral to produce gibbsite, which can then be purified back into raw alumina. The Bayer process and the Hall-Héroult process are still used today to produce a majority of the world's alumina and aluminum.

== Material science as a field of study ==
Most fields of studies have a founding father, such as Newton in physics and Lavoisier in chemistry. Materials science on the other hand has no central figure. In the 1940s, wartime collaborations of multiple fields of study to produce technological advances became a structure to the future field of study that would become known as material science and engineering. One of the reasons behind the advancements during this period was due to the cracking problems associated with the Liberty ships being used during WWII. Various reinforcements were applied to the Liberty ships to arrest the cracking problem, which were some of the first structural tests that gave birth to the study of materials. During the Cold War in the 1950s, US President's Science Advisory Committee (PSAC) made materials a priority, when it realized that materials were the limiting factor for advances in space and military technology. In 1958, President Dwight D. Eisenhower created the Advanced Research Project Agency (ARPA), referred to as the Defense Advanced Research Project Agency (DARPA) since 1996. In 1960, ARPA encouraged the establishment of interdisciplinary laboratories (IDL's) on university campuses, which would be dedicated to the research of materials, as well as to the education of students on how to conduct materials science research. ARPA offered 4 year IDL contracts to universities, originally to Cornell University, University of Pennsylvania, and Northwestern University, eventually granting nine more contracts. Although ARPA is no longer in control of the IDL program (the National Science Foundation took over the program in 1972), the original establishment of IDL's marked a significant milestone in the United States' research and development of materials science. Several institutions departments changed titles from "metallurgy" to "metallurgy and materials science" in the 1960s.

== Modern materials science ==
In the early part of the 20th century, most engineering schools had a department of metallurgy and perhaps of ceramics as well. Much effort was expended on consideration of the austenite - martensite - cementite phases found in the iron - carbon phase diagram that underlies steel production. The fundamental understanding of other materials was not sufficiently advanced for them to be considered as academic subjects. In the post WWII era, the systematic study of polymers advanced particularly rapidly. Rather than create new polymer science departments in engineering schools, administrators and scientists began to conceive of materials science as a new interdisciplinary field in its own right, one that considered all substances of engineering importance from a unified point of view. Northwestern University instituted the first materials science department in 1955.

Richard E. Tressler was an international leader in the development of high temperature materials. He pioneered high temperature fiber testing and use, advanced instrumentation and test methodologies for thermostructural materials, and design and performance verification of ceramics and composites in high temperature aerospace, industrial and energy applications. He was founding director of the Center for Advanced Materials (CAM), which supported many faculty and students from the College of Earth and Mineral Science, the Eberly College of Science, the College of Engineering, the Materials Research Laboratory and the Applied Research Laboratories at Penn State on high temperature materials. His vision for interdisciplinary research played a key role in the creation of the Materials Research Institute. Tressler's contribution to materials science is celebrated with a Penn State lecture named in his honor.

The Materials Research Society (MRS) has been instrumental in creating an identity and cohesion for this young field in the US. MRS was the brainchild of researchers at Penn State University and grew out of discussions initiated by Prof. Rustum Roy in 1970. The first meeting of MRS was held in 1973. As of 2006, MRS has grown into an international society that sponsors a large number of annual meetings and has over 13,000 members. MRS sponsors meetings that are subdivided into symposia on a large variety of topics as opposed to the more focused meetings typically sponsored by organizations like the American Physical Society or the IEEE. The fundamentally interdisciplinary nature of MRS meetings has had a strong influence on the direction of science, particularly in the popularity of the study of soft materials, which are in the nexus of biology, chemistry, physics and mechanical and electrical engineering. Because of the existence of integrative textbooks, materials research societies and university chairs in all parts of the world, BA, MA and PhD programs and other indicators of discipline formation, it is fair to call materials science (and engineering) a discipline.

== Silicon Age ==
The field of crystallography, where X-rays are shone through crystals of a solid material, was founded by William Henry Bragg and his son William Lawrence Bragg at the Institute of Physics during and after World War II. Materials science became a major established discipline following the onset of the Silicon Age and Information Age. This led to the development of modern computers and then mobile phones, with the need to make them smaller, faster and more powerful leading to materials science developing smaller and lighter materials capable of dealing with more complex calculations. This in turn enabled computers to be used to solve complex crystallographic calculations and automate crystallography experiments, allowing researchers to design more accurate and powerful techniques. Along with computers and crystallography, the development of laser technology from 1960 onwards led to the development of light-emitting diodes (used in DVD players and smartphones), fibre-optic communication (used in global telecommunications), and confocal microscopy, a key tool in materials science.

== See also ==
- Timeline of materials technology
- History of hide materials
- History of silk
- Category:Materials scientists and engineers
