= Carl Josef Bayer =

Austrian chemist (1847–1904)

- Born: 4 March 1847; Silesia, Austrian Empire (now Poland)
- Died: 4 October 1904 (aged 57)
- Education: Heidelberg University
- Known for: Extraction of alumina from bauxite,
- Scientific career
- Institutions: Technische Hochschule in Brno; textile industry, St Prtersburg
- Academic advisors: Robert Bunsen

Carl Josef Bayer (also Karl Bayer, 4 March 1847 – 4 October 1904) was a chemist from Austria-Hungary who invented and named the Bayer process of extracting alumina from bauxite, essential to this day to the economical production of aluminium.

Bayer had been working in Saint Petersburg to develop a method to provide alumina to the textile industry that used it as a fixing agent in the dyeing of cotton. In 1887, he discovered that aluminium hydroxide precipitated from an alkaline solution which is crystalline and can be filtered and washed more easily than that precipitated from an acid medium by neutralization. In 1888, Bayer developed and patented his four-stage process of extracting alumina from bauxite ore.

In the mid-19th-century, aluminium was so precious that a bar of the metal was exhibited alongside the French Crown Jewels at the Exposition Universelle in Paris 1855. Along with the Hall–Héroult process, Bayer's solution caused the price of aluminium to drop about 80% in 1890 from what it had been in 1854.

== Personal life and education ==
Carl Bayer was born on 4 March 1847 in the Duchy of Upper and Lower Silesia in the Austrian Empire, which is now Poland. He attended Heidelberg University in Germany, where he studied chemistry under Robert Bunsen from 1869-1871, the namesake of the Bunsen burner. He received his doctorate degree in 1871 with a dissertation on the chemistry of indium, which had just been discovered in 1863. After this he lectured for two years at Technische Hochschule in Brno, and then left to establish his own research company. Bayer then moved to St. Petersburg, Russia, in 1885 where he flourished as an inventor. At age 45 he married the daughter of a Russian politician, Alma Von Witte, and settled in Rietzdorf (modern day Rečica ob Paki, Slovenia). Together they had six children. He died in 1904 at the age of 57. His wife would survive him until 1962, when she died at the age of 94.

== Aluminium ore processing prior to Bayer ==
Bauxite was discovered in 1821 by Pierre Berthier who named it after a village named Les Baux where he found it. To obtain the alumina from the bauxite ore, a process was developed that used acid to dissolve aluminium but resulted in a product that contained large amounts of iron and titanium dissolved within which were difficult to remove. Due to these impurities, the process was not employed for use, but was an approach that was explored. Louis Le Chatelier, in 1855, created a process that produced aluminium hydroxide by heating bauxite with sodium carbonate and then leaching. Bubbling through the solution with carbon dioxide precipitated aluminium hydroxide, which when dried, allowed for the recovery of alumina.

== Bayer's contribution to aluminium ore processing ==
Bayer worked in the textile industry in Saint Petersburg, where aluminium hydroxide was used to help affix dye to the cotton. While working he made two important discoveries regarding processing steps that helped separate the Bayer process from that of Le Chatelier. In 1887, Bayer found that by using a pure seed of aluminium hydroxide, a crystalline precipitate formed that was more economical than that obtained by Le Chatelier. He later patented his discovery in Germany, the United States, and the United Kingdom in 1887. In 1892, Bayer discovered that by using an autoclave, or a pressure leaching vessel, in combination with a sodium hydroxide leachant the process resulted in a very pure sodium aluminate solution that could be used for his precipitation step that he discovered previously. Both steps are widely used today but have been improved upon as technology has evolved. After discovery, Bayer worked as a startup consultant for alumina manufacturing around Europe. Bayer returned to Austria in 1894 to start an alumina factory but was unable to secure enough capital to fully fund the project.

== Importance to the aluminium industry ==
Alumina and aluminium production underwent significant changes in processing due to discoveries made by Karl Bayer, Charles Martin Hall, and Paul Héroult. Hall and Heroult share credit for inventing aluminium electrolysis. The Hall–Heroult method is the primary method of producing modern aluminium and requires high purity alumina to produce aluminium. The Bayer process produces high purity alumina which is then used in the Hall–Heroult process as the main raw material. In 1900, aluminium was valued at the equivalent of $100 (2012 values), but over the next 50 years decreased in price to approximately $20. This decrease is attributed to the increase in the ease of manufacturing associated with aluminium after Bayer, Hall, and Heroult’s discoveries.

== See also ==
- Electrometallurgy
- History of aluminium
- Hydrometallurgy
