= History of aluminium =

Aluminium (or aluminum) metal is very rare in native form, and the process to refine it from ores is complex, so for most of human history it was unknown. However, the compound alum has been known since the 5th century BCE and was used extensively by the ancients for dyeing. During the Middle Ages, its use for dyeing made it a commodity of international commerce. Renaissance scientists believed that alum was a salt of a new earth; during the Age of Enlightenment, it was established that this earth, alumina, was an oxide of a new metal. Discovery of this metal was announced in 1825 by Danish physicist Hans Christian Ørsted, whose work was extended by German chemist Friedrich Wöhler.

Aluminium was difficult to refine and thus uncommon in actual use. Soon after its discovery, the price of aluminium exceeded that of gold. It was reduced only after the initiation of the first industrial production by French chemist Henri Étienne Sainte-Claire Deville in 1856. Aluminium became much more available to the public with the Hall–Héroult process developed independently by French engineer Paul Héroult and American engineer Charles Martin Hall in 1886, and the Bayer process developed by Austrian chemist Carl Josef Bayer in 1889. These processes have been used for aluminium production up to the present.

The introduction of these methods for the mass production of aluminium led to extensive use of the light, corrosion-resistant metal in industry and everyday life. Aluminium began to be used in engineering and construction. In World Wars I and II, aluminium was a crucial strategic resource for aviation. World production of the metal grew from 6,800 metric tons in 1900 to 2,810,000 metric tons in 1954, when aluminium became the most produced non-ferrous metal, surpassing copper.

In the second half of the 20th century, aluminium gained usage in transportation and packaging. Aluminium production became a source of concern due to its effect on the environment, and aluminium recycling gained ground. The metal became an exchange commodity in the 1970s. Production began to shift from developed countries to developing ones; by 2010, China had accumulated an especially large share in both production and consumption of aluminium. World production continued to rise, reaching 58,500,000 metric tons in 2015. Aluminium production exceeds those of all other non-ferrous metals combined.

== Early history ==
"Today, I bring you the victory over the Turk. Every year they wring from the Christians more than three hundred thousand ducats for the alum with which we dye wool. For this is not found among the Latins except a very small quantity. [...] But I have found seven mountains so rich in this material that they could supply seven worlds. If you will give orders to engage workmen, build furnaces, and smelt the ore, you will provide all Europe with alum and the Turk will lose all his profits. Instead they will accrue to you ..."

— Giovanni da Castro to his godfather Pope Pius II in 1461, after discovering a rich source of alum at Tolfa near Rome

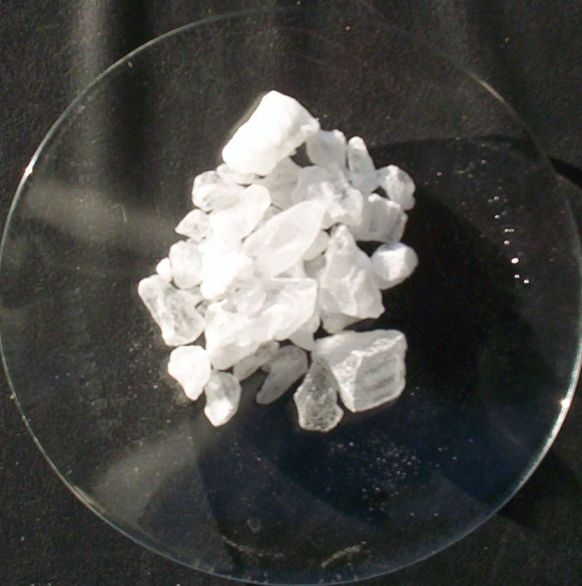
Crystals of alum, the naturally occurring form of which was known back to the ancients.

The history of aluminium was shaped by the usage of its compound alum. The first written record of alum was in the 5th century BCE by Greek historian Herodotus. The ancients used it as a dyeing mordant, in medicine, in chemical milling, and as a fire-resistant coating for wood to protect fortresses from enemy arson. Aluminium metal was unknown. Roman writer Petronius mentioned in his novel Satyricon that an unusual glass had been presented to the emperor: after it was thrown on the pavement, it did not break but only deformed. It was returned to its former shape using a hammer. After learning from the inventor that nobody else knew how to produce this material, the emperor had the inventor executed so that it did not diminish the price of gold. Variations of this story were mentioned briefly in Natural History by Roman historian Pliny the Elder (who noted the story had "been current through frequent repetition rather than authentic") and Roman History by Roman historian Cassius Dio. Some sources suggest this glass could be aluminium. (Note: Deville had established that heating a mixture of sodium chloride, clay, and charcoal yields numerous aluminium globules. This was published in the Proceedings of the Academy of Sciences but eventually forgotten. French chemist André Duboin discovered that heating a mixture of borax, alumina, and smaller quantities of dichromate and silica in a crucible formed impure aluminium. Boric acid is abundant in Italy. According to Duboin, this hints at the possibility that boric acid, potash, and clay under the reducing influence of coal may have produced aluminium in Rome.) (Note: A similar story is attributed to Pliny, which mentions instead a light bright metal extracted from clay—a description that matches that of aluminium. Both Petronius and Pliny, however, mentioned glass (and Dio did not mention the material at all). A possible source of the error is French general Louis Gaspard Gustave Adolphe Yvelin de Béville, who was openly cited by Deville in 1864. De Béville searched in the Roman sources for possible ancient mentions of the new metal and discovered among others the story in Satiricon. De Béville might have misinterpreted Petronius's expression aurum pro luto habere (literally "to have gold as dirt"), assuming that lutum stands for "clay" (a possible translation), whereas the word throughout the book actually means something valueless in general. German chemist Gerhard Eggert concluded that this story was erroneous. After evaluating other possible explanations, he announced the original story was also probably made up; however, he did not evaluate Duboin's suggestion.) It is possible aluminium-containing alloys were produced in China during the reign of the first Jin dynasty (266–420). (Note: Alumina was plentiful and could be reduced by coke in the presence of copper, giving aluminium–copper alloys. Existing works by Chinese alchemists show that alloys with a small aluminium content could be produced in China. The Chinese did not have the technology to produce pure aluminium and the temperatures needed (around 2000 °C) were unachievable. A number of high-aluminium artifacts were found in China supposedly relating to the times of the first Jin dynasty, but it was later shown the technology needed to make them was not available at the time and thus the artifacts were not authentic.)

After the Crusades, alum was a commodity of international commerce; it was indispensable in the European fabric industry. Small alum mines were worked in Catholic Europe but most alum came from the Middle East. Alum continued to be traded through the Mediterranean Sea until the mid-15th century, when the Ottomans greatly increased export taxes. In a few years, alum was discovered in great abundance in Italy. Pope Pius II forbade all imports from the east, using the profits from the alum trade to start a war with the Ottomans. This newly found alum long played an important role in European pharmacy, but the high prices set by the papal government eventually made other states start their own production; large-scale alum mining came to other regions of Europe in the 16th century.

== Establishing the nature of alum ==
I think it not too venturesome to predict that a day will come when the metallic nature of the base of alum will be incontestably proven.

— French chemist Théodore Baron d'Hénouville in 1760 at the Paris Academy of Sciences

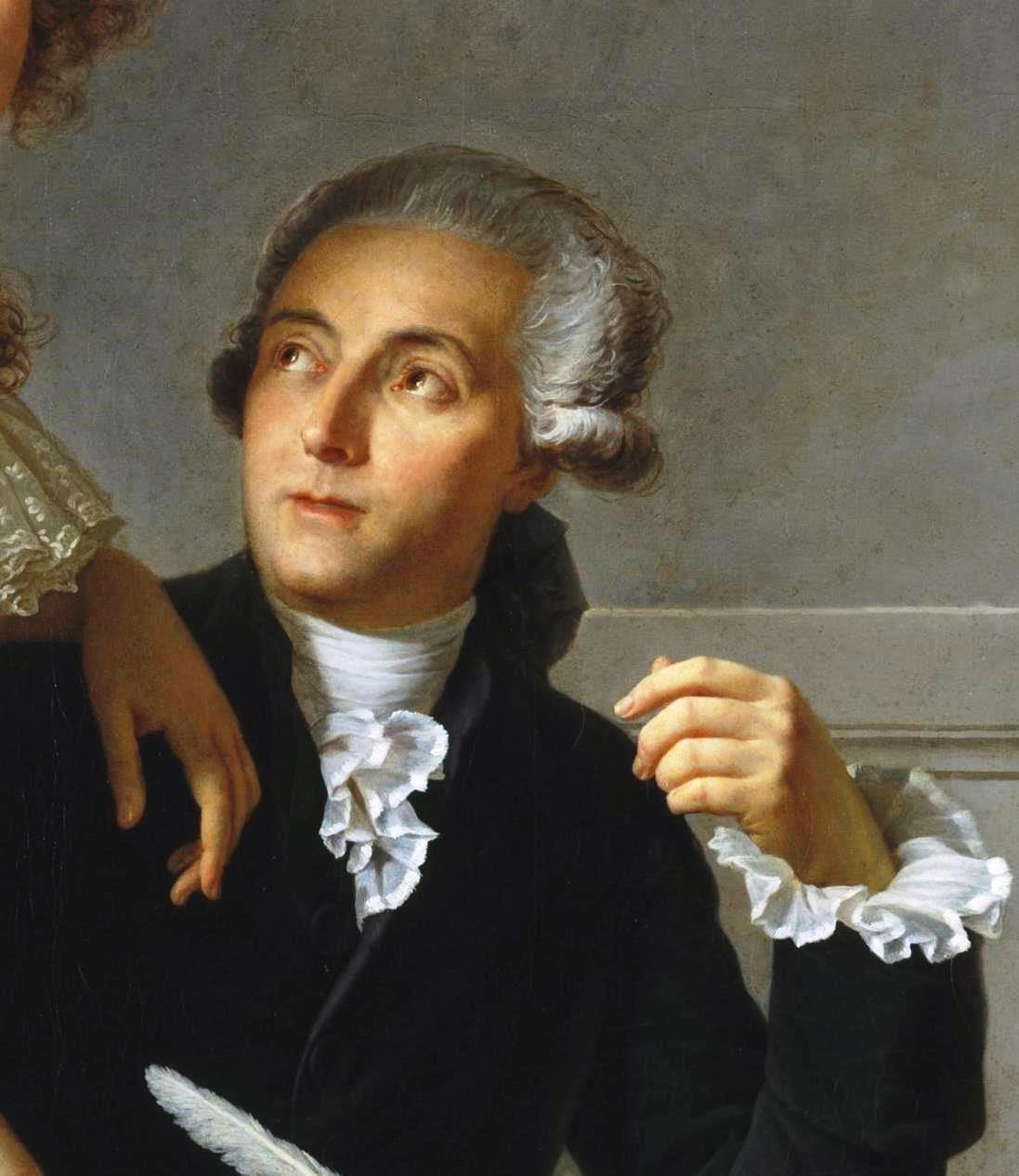
Antoine Lavoisier established that alumina was an oxide of an unknown metal.

At the start of the Renaissance, the nature of alum remained unknown. Around 1530, Swiss physician Paracelsus recognized alum as separate from vitriole (sulfates) and suggested it was a salt of an earth. In 1595, German doctor and chemist Andreas Libavius demonstrated that alum and green and blue vitriole were formed by the same acid but different earths; for the undiscovered earth that formed alum, he proposed the name "alumina". German chemist Georg Ernst Stahl stated that the unknown base of alum was akin to lime or chalk in 1702; this mistaken view was shared by many scientists for half a century. In 1722, German chemist Friedrich Hoffmann suggested that the base of alum was a distinct earth. In 1728, French chemist Étienne Geoffroy Saint-Hilaire claimed alum was formed by an unknown earth and sulfuric acid; he mistakenly believed burning that earth yielded silica. (Geoffroy's mistake was corrected only in 1785 by German chemist and pharmacist Johann Christian Wiegleb. He determined that earth of alum could not be synthesized from silica and alkalis, contrary to contemporary belief.) French chemist Jean Gello proved the earth in clay and the earth resulting from the reaction of an alkali on alum were identical in 1739. German chemist Johann Heinrich Pott showed the precipitate obtained from pouring an alkali into a solution of alum was different from lime and chalk in 1746.

German chemist Andreas Sigismund Marggraf synthesized the earth of alum by boiling clay in sulfuric acid and adding potash in 1754. He realized that adding soda, potash, or an alkali to a solution of the new earth in sulfuric acid yielded alum. He described the earth as alkaline, as he had discovered it dissolved in acids when dried. Marggraf also described salts of this earth: chloride, nitrate and acetate. In 1758, French chemist Pierre Macquer wrote that alumina (Note: The terms "earth of alum" and "alumina" refer to the same substance. German-speaking authors mentioned in this section used "earth of alum" (Alaun-Erde), while French authors used "alumina" (alumine).) resembled a metallic earth. In 1760, French chemist Théodore Baron d'Hénouville expressed his confidence that alumina was a metallic earth.

In 1767, Swedish chemist Torbern Bergman synthesized alum by boiling alunite in sulfuric acid and adding potash to the solution. He also synthesized alum as a reaction product between sulfates of potassium and earth of alum, demonstrating that alum was a double salt. Swedish German pharmaceutical chemist Carl Wilhelm Scheele demonstrated that both alum and silica originated from clay and alum did not contain silicon in 1776. Writing in 1782, French chemist Antoine Lavoisier considered alumina an oxide of a metal with an affinity for oxygen so strong that no known reducing agents could overcome it.

Swedish chemist Jöns Jacob Berzelius suggested the formula AlO_{3} for alumina in 1815. The correct formula, Al_{2}O_{3}, was established by German chemist Eilhard Mitscherlich in 1821; this helped Berzelius determine the correct atomic weight of the metal, 27.

== Isolation of metal ==
This amalgam quickly separates in air, and by distillation, in an inert atmosphere, gives a lump of metal which in color and luster somewhat resembles tin.

— Danish physicist Hans Christian Ørsted in 1825, describing isolation of aluminium at the Royal Danish Academy of Sciences and Letters,

In 1760, Baron de Hénouville unsuccessfully attempted to reduce alumina to its metal. He claimed he had tried every method of reduction known at the time, though his methods were unpublished. It is probable he mixed alum with carbon or some organic substance, with salt or soda for flux, and heated it in a charcoal fire. Austrian chemists Anton Leopold Ruprecht and Matteo Tondi repeated Baron's experiments in 1790, significantly increasing the temperatures. They found small metallic particles they believed were the sought-after metal; but later experiments by other chemists showed these were iron phosphide from impurities in the charcoal and bone ash. German chemist Martin Heinrich Klaproth commented in an aftermath, "if there exists an earth which has been put in conditions where its metallic nature should be disclosed, if it had such, an earth exposed to experiments suitable for reducing it, tested in the hottest fires by all sorts of methods, on a large as well as on a small scale, that earth is certainly alumina, yet no one has yet perceived its metallization." Lavoisier in 1794 and French chemist Louis-Bernard Guyton de Morveau in 1795 melted alumina to a white enamel in a charcoal fire fed by pure oxygen but found no metal. American chemist Robert Hare melted alumina with an oxyhydrogen blowpipe in 1802, also obtaining the enamel, but still found no metal.

In 1807, British chemist Humphry Davy successfully electrolyzed alumina with alkaline batteries, but the resulting alloy contained potassium and sodium, and Davy had no means to separate the desired metal from these. He then heated alumina with potassium, forming potassium oxide but was unable to produce the sought-after metal. In 1808, Davy set up a different experiment on electrolysis of alumina, establishing that alumina decomposed in the electric arc but formed metal alloyed with iron; he was unable to separate the two. Finally, he tried yet another electrolysis experiment, seeking to collect the metal on iron, but was again unable to separate the coveted metal from it. Davy suggested the metal be named alumium in 1808 and aluminum in 1812, thus producing the modern name. Other scientists used the spelling aluminium; the former spelling regained usage in the United States in the following decades.

American chemist Benjamin Silliman repeated Hare's experiment in 1813 and obtained small granules of the sought-after metal, which almost immediately burned.

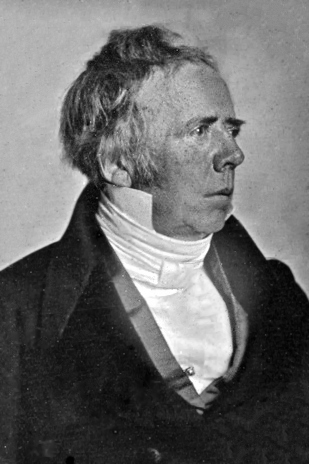
Hans Christian Ørsted, discoverer of aluminium

In 1824, Danish physicist Hans Christian Ørsted attempted to produce the metal. He reacted anhydrous aluminium chloride with potassium amalgam, yielding a lump of metal that looked similar to tin. He presented his results and demonstrated a sample of the new metal in 1825. In 1826, he wrote, "aluminium has a metallic luster and somewhat grayish color and breaks down water very slowly"; this suggests he had obtained an aluminium–potassium alloy, rather than pure aluminium. Ørsted placed little importance on his discovery. He did not notify either Davy or Berzelius, both of whom he knew, and published his work in a Danish magazine unknown to the European public. As a result, he is often not credited as the discoverer of the element; some earlier sources claimed Ørsted had not isolated aluminium.

Berzelius tried isolating the metal in 1825 by carefully washing the potassium analog of the base salt in cryolite in a crucible. Prior to the experiment, he had correctly identified the formula of this salt as K_{3}AlF_{6}. He found no metal, but his experiment came very close to succeeding and was successfully reproduced many times later. Berzelius's mistake was in using an excess of potassium, which made the solution too alkaline and dissolved all the newly formed aluminium.

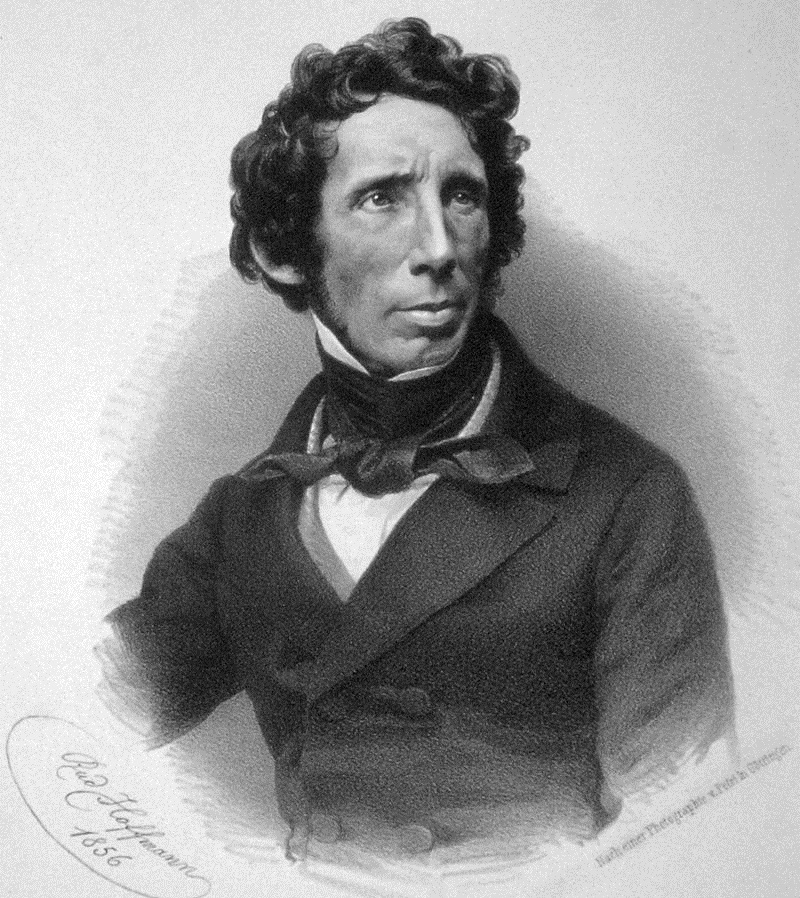
Friedrich Wöhler, pioneer researcher of the properties of aluminium

German chemist Friedrich Wöhler visited Ørsted in 1827 and received explicit permission to continue the aluminium research, which Ørsted "did not have time" for. Wöhler repeated Ørsted's experiments but did not identify any aluminium. (Wöhler later wrote to Berzelius, "what Oersted assumed to be a lump of aluminium was certainly nothing but aluminium-containing potassium".) He conducted a similar experiment, mixing anhydrous aluminium chloride with potassium (the Wöhler process), and produced a powder of aluminium. After hearing about this, Ørsted suggested that his own aluminium might have contained potassium. Wöhler continued his research and in 1845 was able to produce small pieces of the metal and described some of its physical properties. Wöhler's description of the properties indicates that he had obtained impure aluminium. Other scientists also failed to reproduce Ørsted's experiment, and Wöhler was credited as the discoverer for many years. While Ørsted was not concerned with the priority of the discovery, (Note: Ørsted's description of the isolation of the new element, as recorded by the Royal Danish Academy of Sciences and Letters, does not include a name for the metal, neither the name "aluminium" nor a suggestion of his own; in comparison, Wöhler put the word "aluminium" into the title of his article.) some Danes tried to demonstrate he had obtained aluminium. In 1921, the reason for the inconsistency between Ørsted's and Wöhler's experiments was discovered by Danish chemist Johan Fogh, who demonstrated that Ørsted's experiment was successful thanks to use of a large amount of excess aluminium chloride and an amalgam with low potassium content. In 1936, scientists from American aluminium producing company Alcoa successfully recreated that experiment. However, many later sources still credit Wöhler with the discovery of aluminium, as well as its successful isolation in a relatively pure form.

== Early industrial production ==
My first thought was I had laid my hands on this intermediate metal which would find its place in man's uses and needs when we would find the way of taking it out of the chemists' laboratory and putting it in the industry.

— Preface of Aluminium, its properties, manufacture and applications, book written by French chemist Henri Étienne Sainte-Claire Deville in 1859

Since Wöhler's method could not yield large amounts of aluminium, the metal remained uncommon; its cost (Note: Note the difference between cost and price. Cost is the amount of money (and, sometimes, other resources, such as time) that was spent in making a product whereas price is the amount of money (or, sometimes, other goods or services) the product is sold for. Manufacturer's price equals cost plus manufacturer's profit.) had exceeded that of gold before a new method was devised. In 1852, aluminium was sold at US$34 per ounce. In comparison, the price of gold at the time was $19 per ounce.

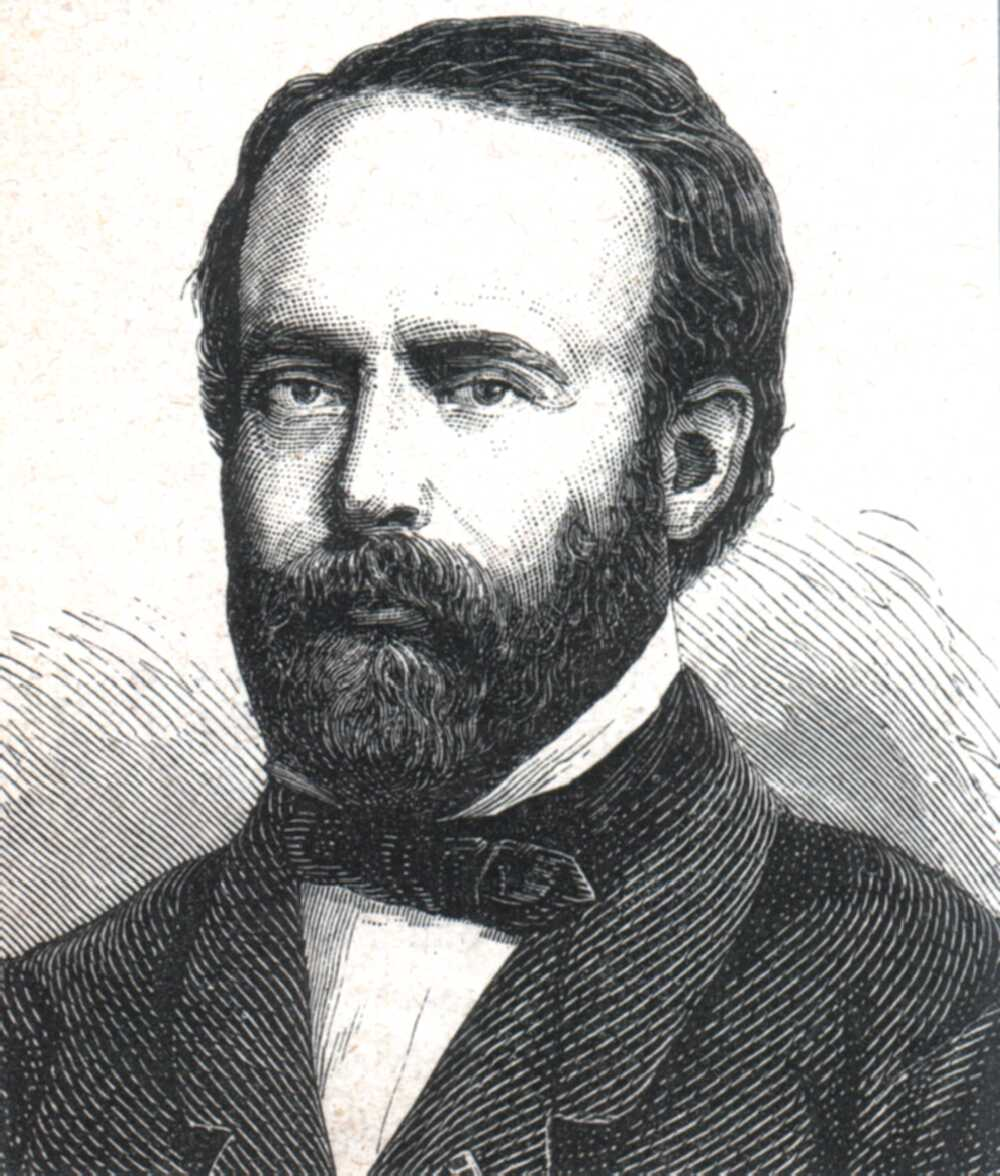
Henri Étienne Sainte-Claire Deville was the first to establish a method to manufacture aluminium.

French chemist Henri Étienne Sainte-Claire Deville announced an industrial method of aluminium production in 1854 at the French Academy of Sciences in Paris. Aluminium chloride could be reduced by sodium, a metal more convenient and less expensive than potassium used by Wöhler. Deville was able to produce an ingot of the metal. Napoleon III of France promised Deville an unlimited subsidy for aluminium research; in total, Deville used 36,000 French francs—20 times the annual income of an ordinary family. Napoleon's interest in aluminium lay in its potential military use: he wished weapons, helmets, armor, and other equipment for the French army could be made of the new light, shiny metal. While the metal was still not displayed to the public, Napoleon is reputed to have held a banquet where the most honored guests were given aluminium utensils while others made do with gold.

Twelve small ingots of aluminium were later exhibited for the first time to the public at the Exposition Universelle of 1855. The metal was presented as "the silver from clay" (aluminium is very similar to silver visually), and this name was soon widely used. It attracted widespread attention; it was suggested aluminium be used in arts, music, medicine, cooking, and tableware. The metal was noticed by the avant-garde writers of the time—Charles Dickens, Nikolay Chernyshevsky, and Jules Verne—who envisioned its use in the future. However, not all attention was favorable. Newspapers wrote, "The Parisian expo put an end to the fairy tale of the silver from clay", saying that much of what had been said about the metal was exaggerated if not untrue and that the amount of the presented metal—about a kilogram—contrasted with what had been expected and was "not a lot for a discovery that was said to turn the world upside down". Overall, the fair led to the eventual commercialization of the metal. That year, aluminium was put to the market at a price of 300 F per kilogram. At the next fair in Paris in 1867, visitors were presented with aluminium wire and foil as well a new alloy—aluminium bronze, notable for its low cost of production, high resistance to corrosion, and desirable mechanical properties.

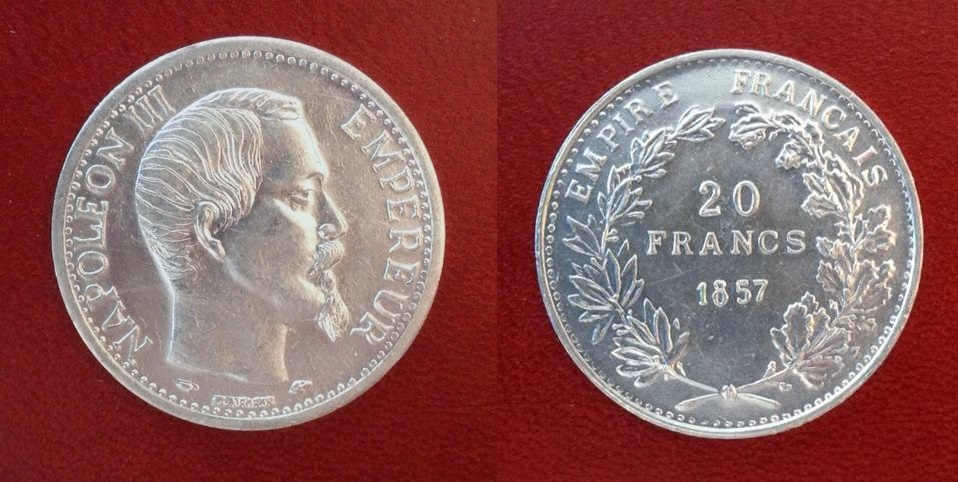
20 French francs aluminium coin from 1857 featuring a portrait of Napoleon III of France, patron of research of aluminium production.

Manufacturers did not wish to divert resources from producing well-known (and marketable) metals, such as iron and bronze, to experiment with a new one; moreover, produced aluminium was still not of great purity and differed in properties by sample. This led to an initial general reluctance to produce the new metal. Deville and partners established the world's first industrial production of aluminium at a smelter in Rouen in 1856. Deville's smelter moved that year to La Glacière and then Nanterre, and in 1857 to Salindres. For the factory in Nanterre, an output of 2 kilograms of aluminium per day was recorded, with a purity of 98%. Originally, production started with synthesis of pure alumina, which was obtained from calcination of ammonium alum. In 1858, Deville was introduced to bauxite and, in collaboration with Louis Le Châtelier, soon developed what became known as the Deville–Pechiney process, employing the mineral as a source for alumina production. In 1860, Deville sold his aluminium interests to Henri Merle, a founder of Compagnie d'Alais et de la Camargue; this company dominated the aluminium market in France decades later.

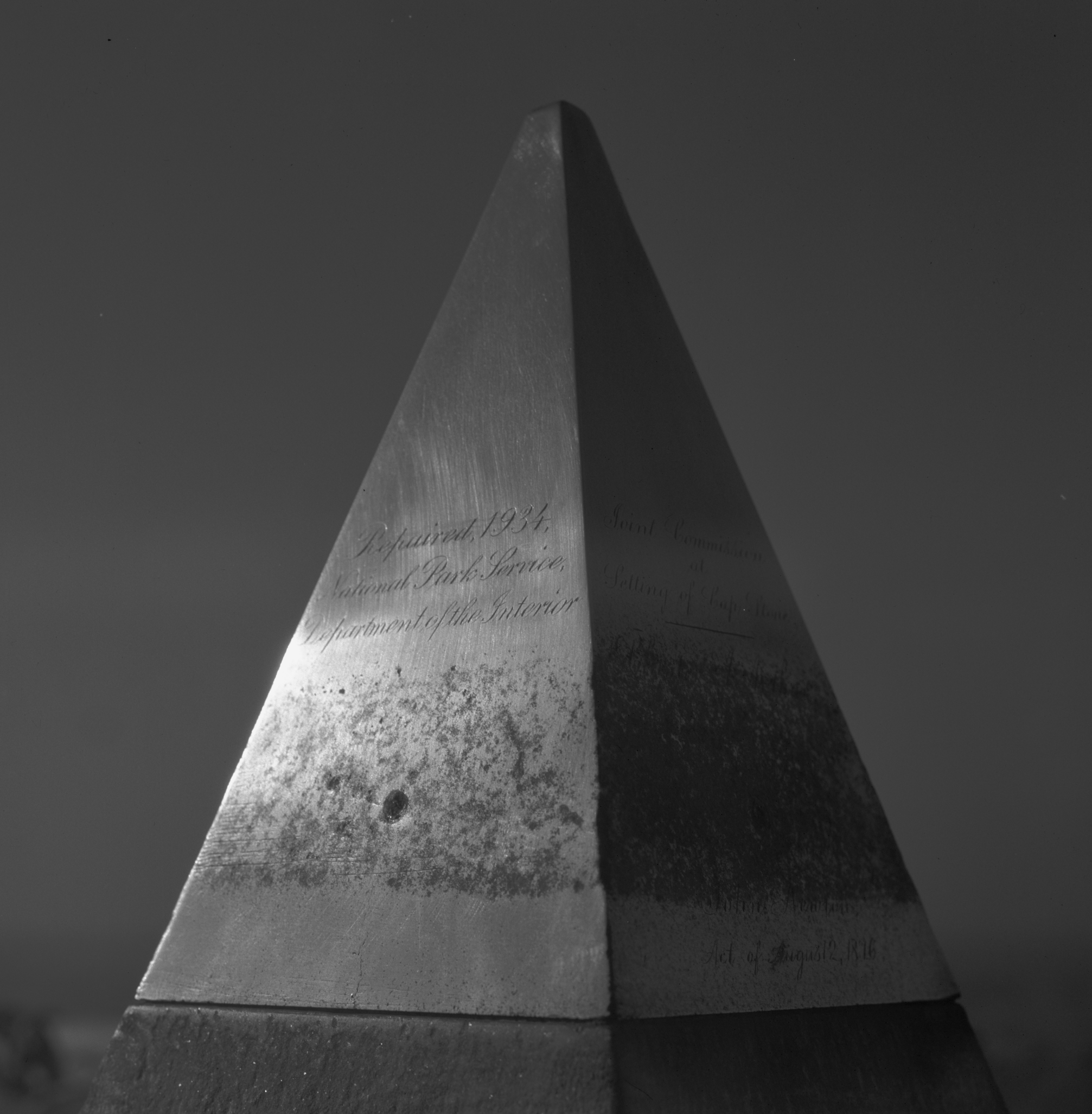
The 2.85-kilogram (6.3 lb) capstone of the Washington Monument (Washington, D.C.) was made from aluminium in 1884. At the time, it was the largest piece of aluminium ever cast.

Some chemists, including Deville, sought to use cryolite as the source ore, but with little success. British engineer William Gerhard set up a plant with cryolite as the primary raw material in Battersea, London, in 1856, but technical and financial difficulties forced the closure of the plant in three years. British ironmaster Isaac Lowthian Bell produced aluminium from 1860 to 1874. During the opening of his factory, he waved to the crowd with a unique and costly aluminium top hat. No statistics about this production can be recovered, but it "cannot be very high". Deville's output grew to 1 metric ton per year in 1860; 1.7 metric tons in 1867; and 1.8 metric tons in 1872. At the time, demand for aluminium was low: for example, sales of Deville's aluminium by his British agents equaled 15 kilograms in 1872. Aluminium at the time was often compared with silver; like silver, it was found to be suitable for making jewelry and objéts d'art. Price for aluminium steadily declined to 240 F in 1859; 200 F in 1862; 120 F in 1867.

Other production sites began to appear in the 1880s. British engineer James Fern Webster launched the industrial production of aluminium by reduction with sodium in 1882; his aluminium was much purer than Deville's (it contained 0.8% impurities whereas Deville's typically contained 2%). World production of aluminium in 1884 equaled 3.6 metric tons. In 1884, American architect William Frishmuth combined production of sodium, alumina, and aluminium into a single technological process; this contrasted with the previous need to collect sodium, which combusts in water and sometimes air; his aluminium production cost was about $16 per pound (compare to silver's cost of $19 per pound, or the French price, an equivalent of $12 per pound). In 1885, Aluminium- und Magnesiumfabrik started production in Hemelingen. Its production figures strongly exceeded those of the factory in Salindres but the factory stopped production in 1888. In 1886, American engineer Hamilton Castner devised a method of cheaper production of sodium, which decreased the cost of aluminium production to $8 per pound, but he did not have enough capital to construct a large factory like Deville's. In 1887, he constructed a factory in Oldbury; Webster constructed a plant nearby and bought Castner's sodium to use it in his own production of aluminium. In 1889, German metallurgist Curt Netto launched a method of reduction of cryolite with sodium that produced aluminium containing 0.5–1.0% of impurities.

== Electrolytic production and commercialization ==
I'm going for that metal.

— Purportedly, American student Charles Martin Hall in 1880, after hearing from his chemistry professor that an industrial production of aluminium would be a great good for humanity and a source of wealth for the discoverer

Cover of the patent granted to Charles Martin Hall for his process of reducing aluminium by electrolysis. Hall applied for the patent two months after Héroult; as a result, it took him almost three years to prove the originality of his method and the patent was only granted in 1889.

Aluminium was first produced independently using electrolysis in 1854 by the German chemist Robert Bunsen and Deville. Their methods did not become the basis for industrial production of aluminium because electrical supplies were inefficient at the time. This changed only with Belgian engineer Zénobe Gramme's invention of the dynamo in 1870, which made creation of large amounts of electricity possible. The invention of the three-phase current by Russian engineer Mikhail Dolivo-Dobrovolsky in 1889 made transmission of this electricity over long distances achievable. Soon after his discovery, Bunsen moved on to other areas of interest while Deville's work was noticed by Napoleon III; this was the reason Deville's Napoleon-funded research on aluminium production had been started. Deville quickly realized electrolytic production was impractical at the time and moved on to chemical methods, presenting results later that year.

Electrolytic mass production remained difficult because electrolytic baths could not withstand prolonged contact with molten salts, succumbing to corrosion. The first attempt to overcome this for aluminium production was made by American engineer Charles Bradley in 1883. Bradley heated aluminium salts internally: the highest temperature was inside the bath and the lowest was on its walls, where salts would solidify and protect the bath. Bradley then sold his patent claim to brothers Alfred and Eugene Cowles, who used it at a smelter in Lockport and later in Stoke-upon-Trent but the method was modified to yield alloys rather than pure aluminium. Bradley applied for a patent in 1883; due to his broad wordings, it was rejected as composed of prior art. After a necessary two-year break, he re-applied. This process lasted for six years, as the patent office questioned whether Bradley's ideas were original. When Bradley was granted a patent, electrolytic aluminium production had already been in place for several years.

The first large-scale production method was independently developed by French engineer Paul Héroult and American engineer Charles Martin Hall in 1886; it is now known as the Hall–Héroult process. Pure alumina's very high melting point made electrolysis impractical; both Héroult and Hall realized it could be greatly lowered by the presence of molten cryolite. (Note: Although very similar and now commonly seen as one, Hall and Héroult processes had some small initial differences. For instance, Héroult used coal anodes while Hall used copper.) Héroult was granted a patent in France in April and subsequently in several other European countries; he also applied for a U.S. patent in May. After securing a patent, Héroult could not find interest in his invention. When asking professionals for advice, he was told there was no demand for aluminium but some for aluminium bronze. The factory in Salindres did not wish to improve its process. In 1888, Héroult and his companions founded Aluminium Industrie Aktiengesellschaft and started industrial production of aluminium bronze in Neuhausen am Rheinfall. Then, Société électrométallurgique française was founded in Paris. They convinced Héroult to return to France, purchased his patents, and appointed him as the director of a smelter in Isère, which produced aluminium bronze on a large scale at first and pure aluminium in a few months.

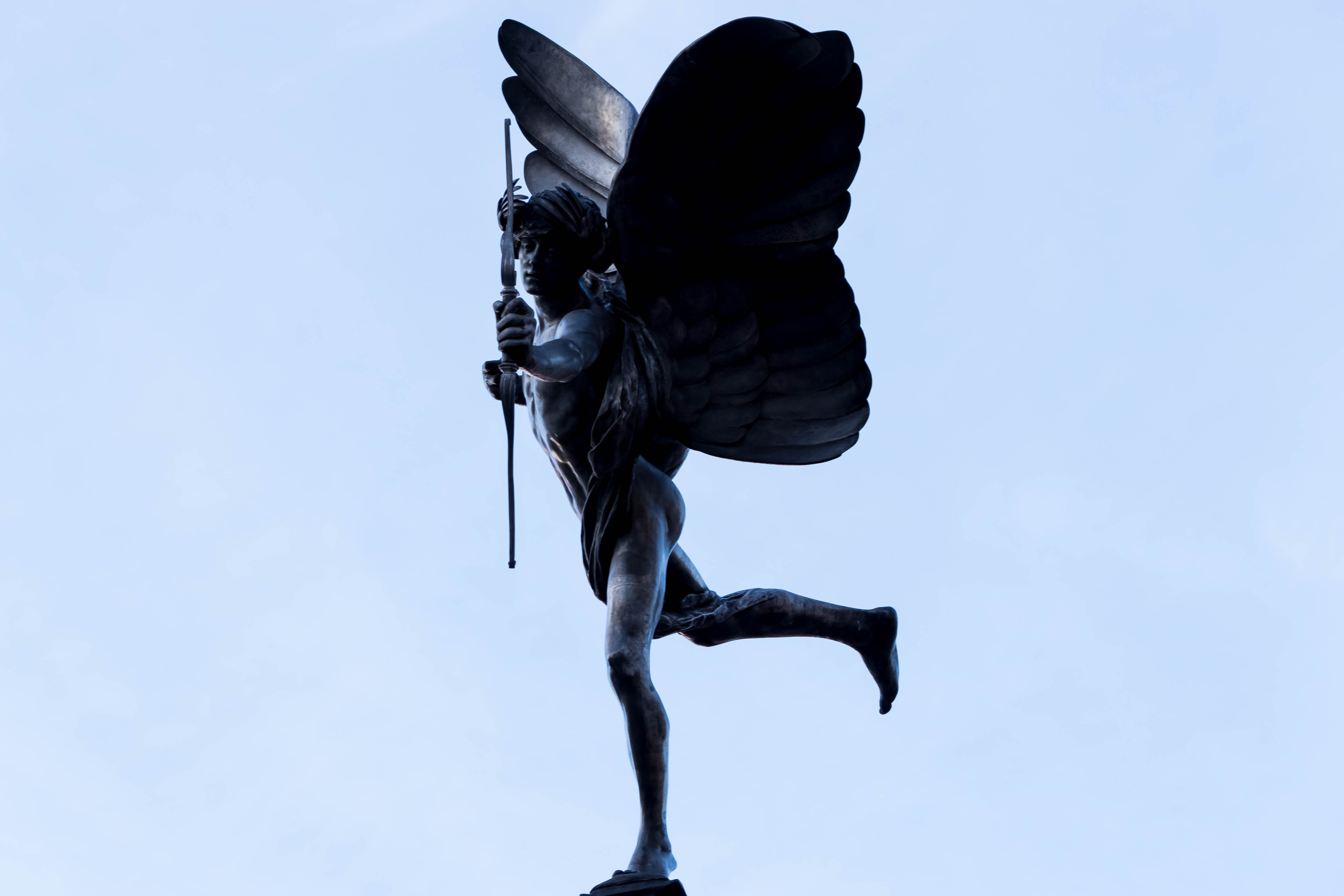
Statue of Anteros, Greek god of requited love, atop Piccadilly Circus, erected in 1893, considered the first major work in aluminium.

At the same time, Hall produced aluminium by the same process in his home at Oberlin. He applied for a patent in July, and the patent office notified Hall of an "interference" with Héroult's application. The Cowles brothers offered legal support. By then, Hall had failed to develop a commercial process for his first investors, and he turned to experimenting at Cowles' smelter in Lockport. He experimented for a year without much success but gained the attention of investors. (Note: The Cowles brothers did not wish to change their production method because they feared that mass production of aluminium would immediately reduce the metal's price. The president of the company considered purchasing Hall's patent (which was still not granted at the time) to ensure that competitors would not make use of it.) Hall co-founded the Pittsburgh Reduction Company in 1888 and initiated production of aluminium. Hall's patent was granted in 1889. (Note: Hall was able to prove his originality thanks to his keeping record on experiments. Hall documented the isolation of aluminium in February 1886, and his family members provided evidence for that. In contrast, the earliest date to which Héroult's invention could be traced back was the date of granting of the French patent in April.) In 1889, Hall's production began to use the principle of internal heating. (Note: Because the principle of internal heating was missing from Hall's patent, the Cowles brothers believed Hall had stolen it from them and sued his company in 1891. This lawsuit was resolved only in 1903; the Pittsburgh Reduction Company had to pay a large indemnity.) By September 1889, Hall's production grew to 385 pounds (175 kilograms) at a cost of $0.65 per pound. By 1890, Hall's company still lacked capital and did not pay dividends; Hall had to sell some of his shares to attract investments. During that year, a new factory in Patricroft was constructed. The smelter in Lockport was unable to withstand the competition and shut down by 1892.

The Hall–Héroult process converts alumina into the metal. Austrian chemist Carl Josef Bayer discovered a way of purifying bauxite to yield alumina in 1888 at a textile factory in Saint Petersburg and was issued a patent later that year; this is now known as the Bayer process. Bayer sintered bauxite with alkali and leached it with water; after stirring the solution and introducing a seeding agent to it, he found a precipitate of pure aluminium hydroxide, which decomposed to alumina on heating. In 1892, while working at a chemical plant in Yelabuga, he discovered the aluminium contents of bauxite dissolved in the alkaline leftover from isolation of alumina solids; this was crucial for the industrial employment of this method. He was issued a patent later that year.

The total amount of unalloyed aluminium produced using Deville's chemical method from 1856 to 1889 equaled 200 metric tons. Production in 1890 alone was 175 metric tons. It grew to 715 metric tons in 1893 and to 4,034 metric tons in 1898. The price fell to $2 per pound in 1889 and to $0.5 per pound in 1894.

World production of aluminium from 1885 to 1899

By the end of 1889, a consistently high purity of aluminium produced via electrolysis had been achieved. In 1890, Webster's factory went obsolete after an electrolysis factory was opened in England. Netto's main advantage, the high purity of the resulting aluminium, was outmatched by electrolytic aluminium and his company closed the following year. Compagnie d'Alais et de la Camargue also decided to switch to electrolytic production, and their first plant using this method was opened in 1895.

Modern production of the aluminium is based on the Bayer and Hall–Héroult processes. It was further improved in 1920 by a team led by Swedish chemist Carl Wilhelm Söderberg. Previously, anode electrodes had been made from pre-baked coal blocks, which quickly corrupted and required replacement; the team introduced continuous electrodes made from a coke and tar paste in a reduction chamber. This advance greatly increased the world output of aluminium.

== Mass usage ==
Give us aluminum in the right quantity, and we will be able to fight for another four years.

— Soviet leader Joseph Stalin to Harry Hopkins, personal representative of the U.S. President Franklin D. Roosevelt, in August 1941,

Prices for aluminium declined, and by the early 1890s, the metal had become widely used in jewelry, eyeglass frames, optical instruments, and many everyday items. Aluminium cookware began to be produced in the late 19th century and gradually supplanted copper and cast iron cookware in the first decades of the 20th century. Aluminium foil was popularized at that time. Aluminium is soft and light, but it was soon discovered that alloying it with other metals could increase its hardness while preserving its low density. Aluminium alloys found many uses in the late 19th and early 20th centuries. For instance, aluminium bronze is applied to make flexible bands, sheets, and wire, and is widely employed in the shipbuilding and aviation industries. Aviation used a new aluminium alloy, duralumin, invented in 1903. Aluminium recycling began in the early 1900s and has been used extensively since as aluminium is not impaired by recycling and thus can be recycled repeatedly. At this point, only the metal that had not been used by end-consumers was recycled. During World War I, major governments demanded large shipments of aluminium for light strong airframes. They often subsidized factories and the necessary electrical supply systems. Overall production of aluminium peaked during the war: world production of aluminium in 1900 was 6,800 metric tons; in 1916, annual production exceeded 100,000 metric tons. The war created a greater demand for aluminium, which the growing primary production was unable to fully satisfy, and recycling grew intensely as well. The peak in production was followed by a decline, then a swift growth.

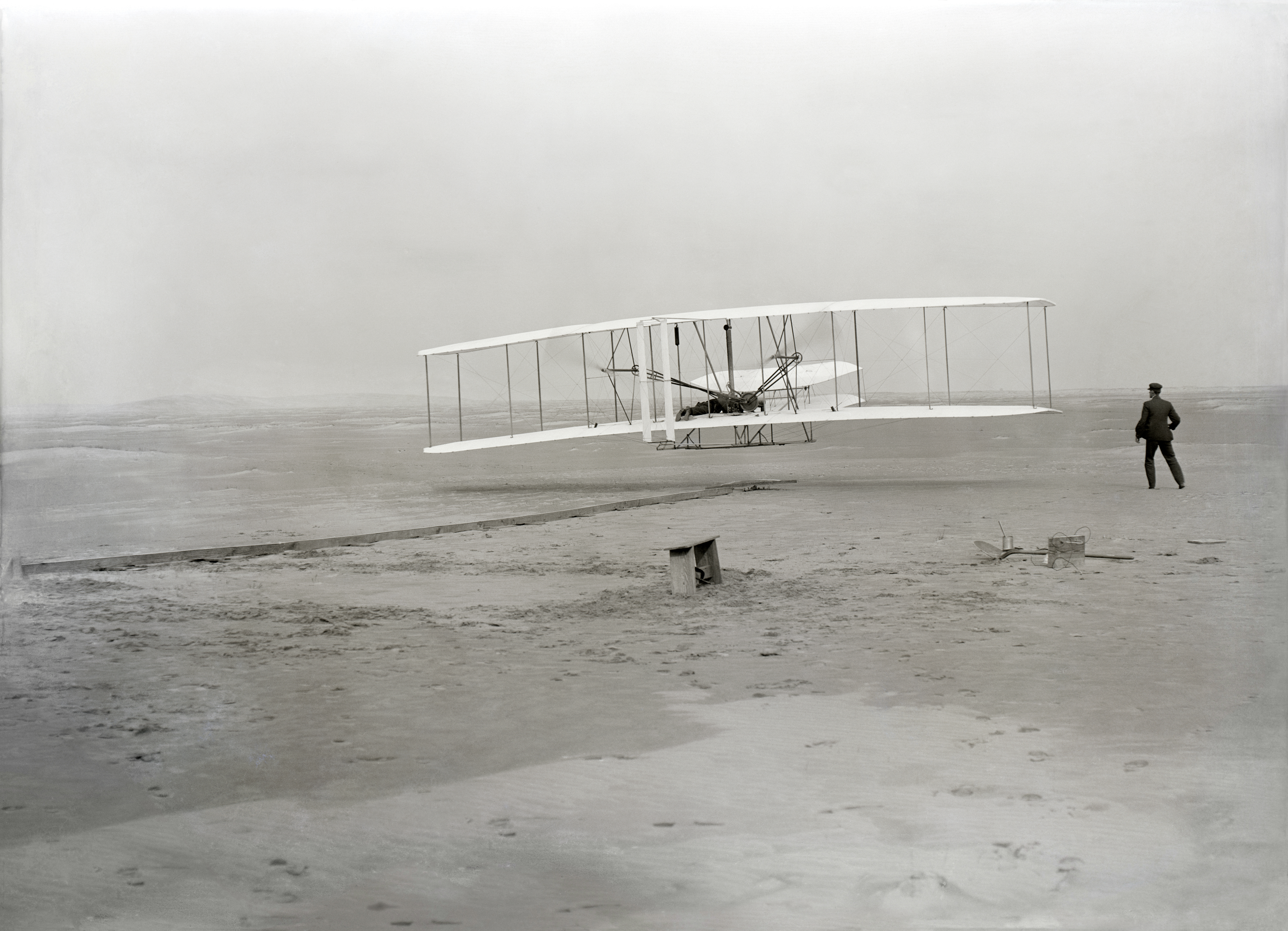
The Wright Flyer use light aluminium alloyed with copper for strength.

During the first half of the 20th century, the real price for aluminium fell continuously from $14,000 per metric ton in 1900 to $2,340 in 1948 (in 1998 United States dollars). There were some exceptions such as the sharp price rise during World War I. Aluminium was plentiful, and in 1919 Germany began to replace its silver coins with aluminium ones; more and more denominations were switched to aluminium coins as hyperinflation progressed in the country. By the mid-20th century, aluminium had become a part of everyday lives, becoming an essential component of housewares. Aluminium freight cars first appeared in 1931. Their lower mass allowed them to carry more cargo. During the 1930s, aluminium emerged as a civil engineering material used in both basic construction and building interiors. Its use in military engineering for both airplanes and tank engines advanced.

Aluminium obtained from recycling was considered inferior to primary aluminium because of poorer chemistry control as well as poor removal of dross and slags. Recycling grew overall but depended largely on the output of primary production: for instance, as electric energy prices declined in the United States in the late 1930s, more primary aluminium could be produced using the energy-expensive Hall–Héroult process. This rendered recycling less necessary, and thus aluminium recycling rates went down. By 1940, mass recycling of post-consumer aluminium had begun.

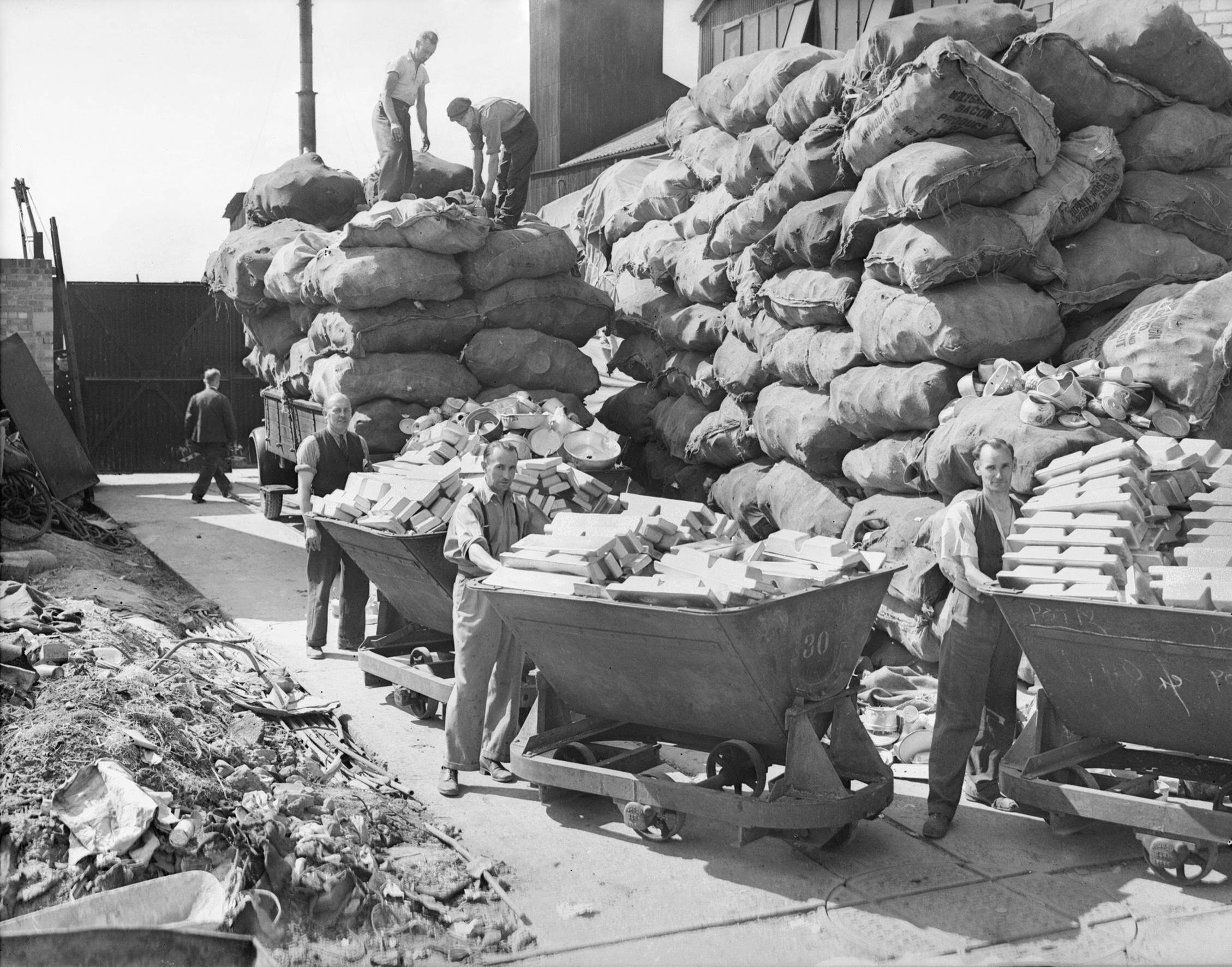
During World War II, the British collected aluminium utensils from households to be made into aircraft.

During World War II, production peaked again, exceeding 1,000,000 metric tons for the first time in 1941. Aluminium was used heavily in aircraft production and was a strategic material of extreme importance; so much so that when Alcoa (successor of Hall's Pittsburgh Reduction Company and the aluminium production monopolist in the United States at the time) did not expand its production, the United States Secretary of the Interior proclaimed in 1941, "If America loses the war, it can thank the Aluminum Corporation of America". In 1939, Germany was the world's leading producer of aluminium; the Germans thus saw aluminium as their edge in the war. Aluminium coins continued to be used but while they symbolized a decline on their introduction, by 1939, they had come to represent power. (In 1941, they began to be withdrawn from circulation to save the metal for military needs.) After the United Kingdom was attacked in 1940, it started an ambitious program of aluminium recycling; the newly appointed Minister of Aircraft Production appealed to the public to donate any household aluminium for airplane building. (Note: This campaign was not effective as a means to achieve the declared goal, collecting of aluminium for production of airplanes: the collected metal was not of high quality, required manual working (such as removal of wooden handles of pans), and aluminium was available as unused kitchenware in stores and as scrap; already existing scrap in particular could be easily converted into the required grade purity of aluminium and could not be sold elsewhere. However, the campaign boosted the morale of the British civilian public who engaged in the wartime effort.) The Soviet Union received 328,100 metric tons of aluminium from its co-combatants from 1941 to 1945; this aluminium was used in aircraft and tank engines. Without these shipments, the output of the Soviet aircraft industry would have fallen by over a half.

After the wartime peak, world production fell for three late-war and post-war years but then regained its rapid growth. In 1954, the world output equaled 2,810,000 metric tons; this production surpassed that of copper, (Note: Compare annual statistics of aluminium and copper production by USGS.) historically second in production only to iron, making it the most produced non-ferrous metal.

== Aluminium Age ==
Nothing stops time. One epoch follows another, and sometimes we don't even notice it. The Stone Age... The Bronze Age... The Iron Age... [...now] we stand on the threshold of the Aluminium Age.

— Aluminium: The Thirteenth Element,

Earth's first artificial satellite Sputnik 1, launched in 1957, consisted of two joined aluminium hemispheres. All subsequent spacecraft have used aluminium to some extent. The aluminium can was first manufactured in 1956 and employed as a container for drinks in 1958. In the 1960s, aluminium was employed for the production of wires and cables. Since the 1970s, high-speed trains have commonly used aluminium for its high strength-to-weight ratio. For the same reason, the aluminium content of cars is growing.

Six major companies dominated the world market (Note: Note that not all economies in the world were market economies; for example, the Soviet Union had a planned economy.) by 1955: Alcoa, Alcan (originated as a part of Alcoa), Reynolds, Kaiser, Pechiney (merger of Compagnie d'Alais et de la Camargue that bought Deville's smelter and Société électrométallurgique française that hired Héroult), and Alusuisse (successor of Héroult's Aluminium Industrie Aktien Gesellschaft); their combined share of the market equaled 86%. From 1945, aluminium consumption grew by almost 10% each year for nearly three decades, gaining ground in building applications, electric cables, basic foils and the aircraft industry. In the early 1970s, an additional boost came from the development of aluminium beverage cans. The real price declined until the early 1970s; in 1973, the real price equaled $2,130 per metric ton (in 1998 United States dollars). The main drivers of the drop in price was the decline of extraction and processing costs, technological progress, and the increase in aluminium production, which first exceeded 10,000,000 metric tons in 1971.

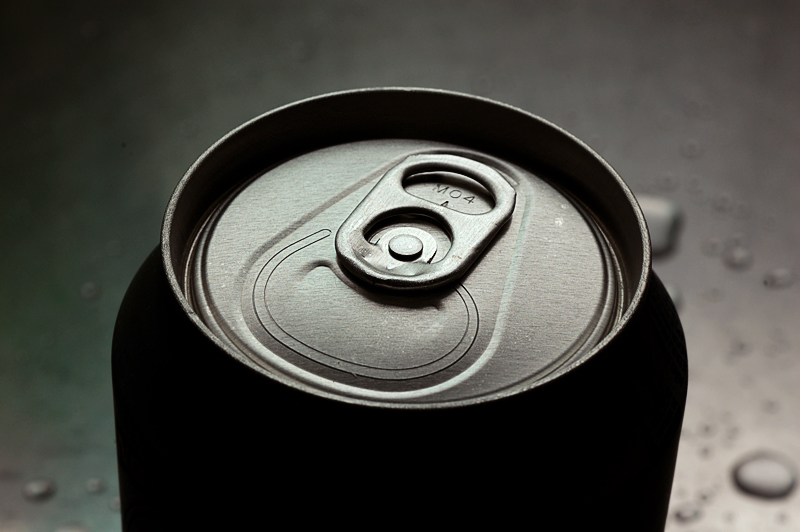
Aluminium can

In the late 1960s, governments became aware of waste from the industrial production; they enforced a series of regulations favoring recycling and waste disposal. Söderberg anodes, which save capital and labor to bake the anodes but are more harmful to the environment (because of a greater difficulty in collecting and disposing of the baking fumes), fell into disfavor, and production began to shift back to the pre-baked anodes. The aluminium industry began promoting the recycling of aluminium cans in an attempt to avoid restrictions on them. This sparked recycling of aluminium previously used by end-consumers: for example, in the United States, levels of recycling of such aluminium increased 3.5 times from 1970 to 1980 and 7.5 times to 1990. Production costs for primary aluminium grew in the 1970s and 1980s, and this also contributed to the rise of aluminium recycling. Closer composition control and improved refining technology diminished the quality difference between primary and secondary aluminium.

In the 1970s, the increased demand for aluminium made it an exchange commodity; it entered the London Metal Exchange, the world's oldest industrial metal exchange, in 1978. Since then, aluminium has been traded for United States dollars and its price fluctuated along with the currency's exchange rate. The need to exploit lower-grade poorer quality deposits and fast increasing input costs of energy, but also bauxite, as well as changes in exchange rates and greenhouse gas regulation, increased the net cost of aluminium; the real price grew in the 1970s.

Prices of aluminium since 1900: Nominal (blue) and real (red, in 1998)

The increase of the real price, and changes of tariffs and taxes, began the redistribution of world producers' shares: the United States, the Soviet Union, and Japan accounted for nearly 60% of world's primary production in 1972 (and their combined share of consumption of primary aluminium was also close to 60%); but their combined share only slightly exceeded 10% in 2012. The production shift began in the 1970s with production moving from the United States, Japan, and Western Europe to Australia, Canada, the Middle East, Russia, and China, where it was cheaper due to lower electricity prices and favorable state regulation, such as low taxes or subsidies. Production costs in the 1980s and 1990s declined because of advances in technology, lower energy and alumina prices, and high exchange rates of the United States dollar.

In the 2000s, the BRIC countries' (Brazil, Russia, India and China) combined share grew from 32.6% to 56.5% in primary production and 21.4% to 47.8% in primary consumption. China has accumulated an especially large share of world production, thanks to an abundance of resources, cheap energy, and governmental stimuli; it also increased its share of consumption from 2% in 1972 to 40% in 2010. The only other country with a two-digit percentage was the United States with 11%; no other country exceeded 5%. In the United States, Western Europe and Japan, most aluminium was consumed in transportation, engineering, construction, and packaging.

World production of aluminium since 1900

In the mid-2000s, increasing energy, alumina and carbon (used in anodes) prices caused an increase in production costs. This was amplified by a shift in currency exchange rates: not only a weakening of the United States dollar, but also a strengthening of the Chinese yuan. The latter became important as most Chinese aluminium was relatively cheap.

World output continued growing: in 2018, it was a record 63,600,000 metric tons before falling slightly in 2019. Aluminium is produced in greater quantities than all other non-ferrous metals combined. Its real price (in 1998 United States dollars) in 2019 was $1,400 per metric ton ($2,190 per ton in contemporary dollars).

== See also ==
- List of countries by aluminium production

== Bibliography ==
- Drozdov, Andrey (2007). Aluminium: The Thirteenth Element (PDF). RUSAL Library. ISBN 978-5-91523-002-5. Archived from the original (PDF) on 2016-04-16.
- McNeil, Ian (2002). An Encyclopedia of the History of Technology. Routledge. ISBN 978-1-134-98165-6.
- Nappi, Carmine (2013). The global aluminium industry 40 years from 1972 (PDF) (Report). International Aluminium Institute.
- Richards, Joseph William (1896). Aluminium: Its history, occurrence, properties, metallurgy and applications, including its alloys (3 ed.). Henry Carey Baird & Co.
- Skrabec, Quentin R. (2017). Aluminum in America: A History. McFarland. ISBN 978-1-4766-2564-5.
