= Deville–Pechiney process =

Early industrial process

The Deville–Pechiney process, also known as the Le Châtelier process, was the first industrial process used to produce alumina from bauxite.

The Frenchman Henri Sainte-Claire Deville invented the process in 1859, in collaboration with Louis Le Châtelier. In 1860, Deville sold his aluminium interests to Henri Merle, a founder of Compagnie d'Alais et de la Camargue, later known as Pechiney. It is based on the extraction of alumina with sodium carbonate.

The first stage is the calcination of the bauxite at 1200 °C with sodium carbonate and coke. The alumina is converted in sodium aluminate. Iron oxide remains unchanged and silica forms a polysilicate.

In the second stage sodium hydroxide solution is added, which dissolves the sodium aluminate, leaving the impurities as a solid residue. The amount of sodium hydroxide solution needed depends upon the amount of silica present in the raw material. The solution is filtered off; carbon dioxide is bubbled through the solution, causing aluminium hydroxide to precipitate, leaving a solution of sodium carbonate. The latter can be recovered and reused in the first stage.

The aluminium hydroxide is calcined to produce alumina.

The process was used in France at Salindres until 1923 and in Germany and Great Britain until the outbreak of the Second World War.

While it has largely been replaced by the Bayer process, an updated version is still in use for processing high-silica bauxite.

== See also ==
- Bayer process
- History of aluminium
- Orbite process
