= Hoopes process =

Metallurgic process involving aluminium

The Hoopes process is a metallurgical process, used to obtain aluminium metal of very high purity (about 99.99% pure). The process was patented by William Hoopes, a chemist of the Aluminum Company of America (ALCOA), in 1925.

== Introduction ==
It is a method used to obtain aluminium of very high purity. The metal obtained in the Hall–Héroult process is about 99.5% pure, and for most purposes it is taken as pure metal. However, further purification of aluminium can be carried out by the Hoopes process. This is an electrolytic process.

== The process ==
A Hoopes cell consists of an iron tank lined with carbon at the bottom, containing three layers of molten metal; an alloy of copper, crude aluminium and silicon on the bottom (serving as the anode), a mixture of fluorides of sodium, aluminium and barium (cryolite + BaF_{2}) in the middle, and pure aluminium at the top. A set of graphite rods dipped in molten aluminium serve as the cathode. During electrolysis, aluminium is oxidised to Al^{3+} ions in the bottom layer. These ions migrate up through the middle layer before being reduced back to aluminium at the top layer, where it can be tapped off.
