= Orbite Technologies =

Orbite Technologies Inc.
- Company type: Public
- Traded as: Expert Market: EORBF
- Founded: Montreal, Quebec
- Headquarters: Canada
- Key people: Glenn Kelly, CEO
- Products: Alumina, technology for the mining industry
- Website: www.orbitetech.com

Orbite Technologies Inc. was a Canadian cleantech company based in Montreal, Canada. It specialized in extracting processes for mining industry, especially alumina extraction. Its main asset is the Orbite process which can be used as a cheaper and pollution-free replacement of the Bayer process as well as a way to treat red mud. In April 2017, the company declared bankruptcy, due to ongoing delays and issues relating to its construction of a new plant in Cap-Chat, Quebec. As of January 2018, the bankruptcy process was still ongoing. As of 2022 the company has rebranded itself as Advanced Energy Minerals, and claims to be manufacturing high purity alumina at its new Cap-Chat plant.

== Orbite process ==
The Orbite process is an industrial means to refine aluminum ores (such as bauxite) to produce alumina (aluminum oxide) patented by Orbite Alumnae using acid rather than sodium hydroxide like in the Bayer process. It’s also a way to treat red mud in order to extract the minerals it still contains. It does not produce any industrial waste in significant quantity. The process uses hydrochloric acid that is entirely recovered by the end of the process. It works well with low quality bauxite and many other raw materials.

=== The process ===
The Orbite process is divided in four steps: aluminum ore preparation, leaching, extraction of alumina, extraction of iron and calcination. First, the raw material is reduced into fine particles to increase the contact surface. Doing so maximize the effect of the acid leaching which is the next step. The acid leaching then occurs at very high temperature using hydrochloric acid. At the end of the leaching all metal molecules (excluding titanium) react to produce chloride compounds. Specifically, iron molecules form ferric chloride (FeCl_{3}) and alumina molecule form aluminum trichloride (AlCl_{3}). Silica is then removed by simple filtration becoming the main leftover of the process. Afterward, the aluminum trichloride is removed by precipitation. The step of the high temperature calcination transforms it into alumina. The leachate still containing FeCl_{3} is hydrolysed at low temperature, producing ferric oxide and regenerating the hydrochloric acid. Rare earth and other metals can then be extracted using common process.

== See also ==
- Red mud
- Alumina
- Bayer process
