= Louis Gaspard Gustave Adolphe Yvelin de Béville =

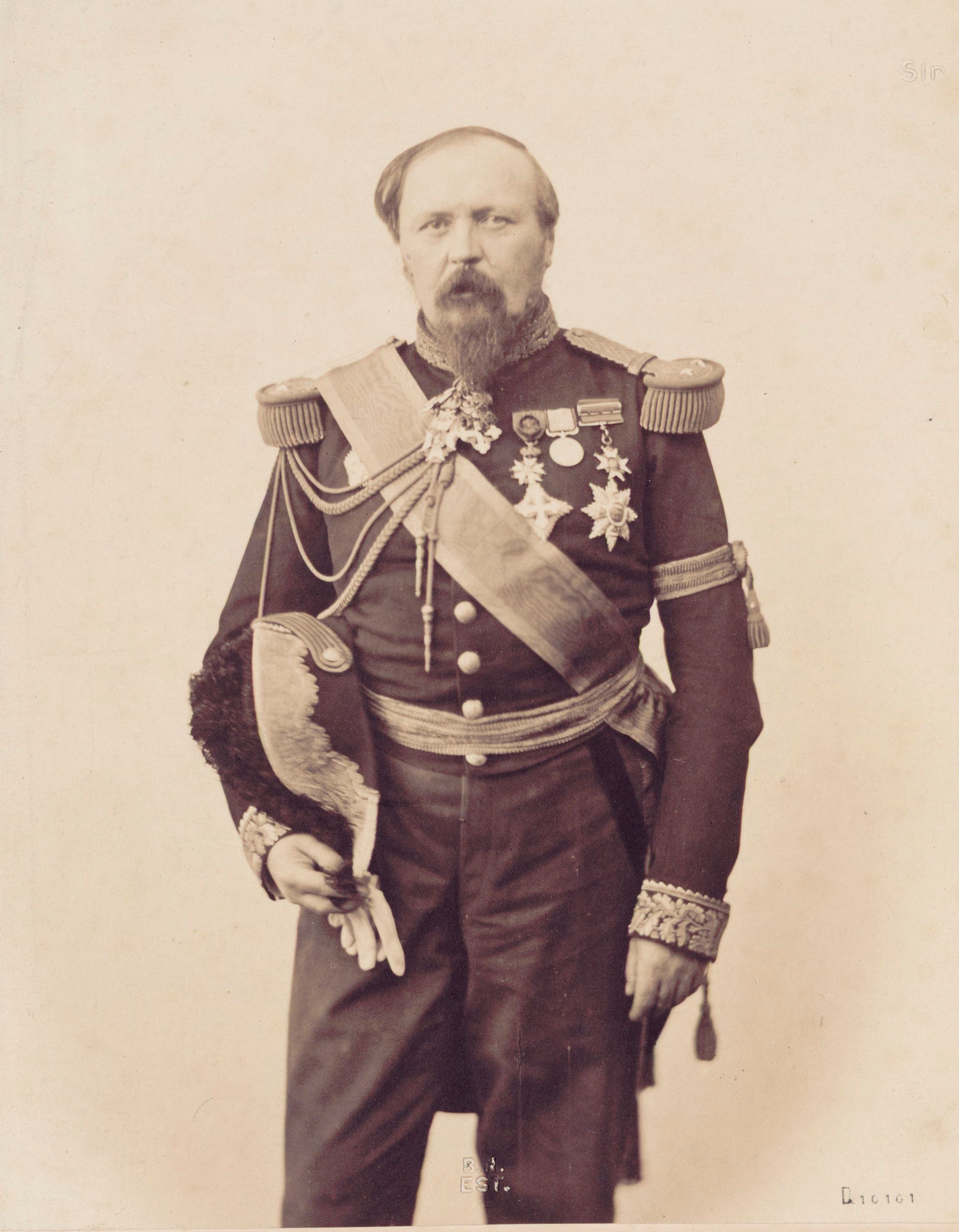
Photographic portrait of Louis Gaspard Gustave Adolphe Yvelin de Béville (1857) by Gustave Le Gray

Louis Gaspard Gustave Adolphe Yvelin de Béville (24 May 1806 – 1872) was a Grand Officer of the Legion of Honour, divisional general, and ancien aide-de-camp of Emperor Napoleon III. He was born in Rouen on 24 May 1806, was married on 15 October 1839 and died in 1872.
