= Hall–Héroult process =

Aluminium smelting process

The Hall–Héroult process is the major industrial process for smelting aluminium. It involves dissolving aluminium oxide (alumina) (obtained most often from bauxite, aluminium's chief ore, through the Bayer process) in molten cryolite and electrolyzing the molten salt bath, typically in a purpose-built cell. The process, conducted at an industrial scale, happens at 940–980 °C (1700–1800 °F) and produces aluminium with a purity of 99.5–99.8%. Recycling aluminum, which does not require electrolysis, is thus not treated using this method.

The Hall–Héroult process consumes substantial electrical energy, and its electrolysis stage can produce significant amounts of carbon dioxide if the electricity is generated from high-emission sources. Furthermore, the process generates fluorocarbon compounds as byproducts, contributing to both air pollution and climate change.

== Process ==
=== Difficulties faced ===
Elemental aluminium cannot be produced by the electrolysis of an aqueous aluminium salt, because hydronium ions readily oxidize elemental aluminium. Although a molten aluminium salt could be used instead, aluminium oxide has a melting point of 2072 °C (3762 °F) so electrolysing it is impractical. In the Hall–Héroult process, alumina, Al_{2}O_{3}, is dissolved in molten synthetic cryolite, Na_{3}AlF_{6}, to lower its melting point for easier electrolysis. The carbon source is generally coke, a fossil fuel.

=== Theory ===
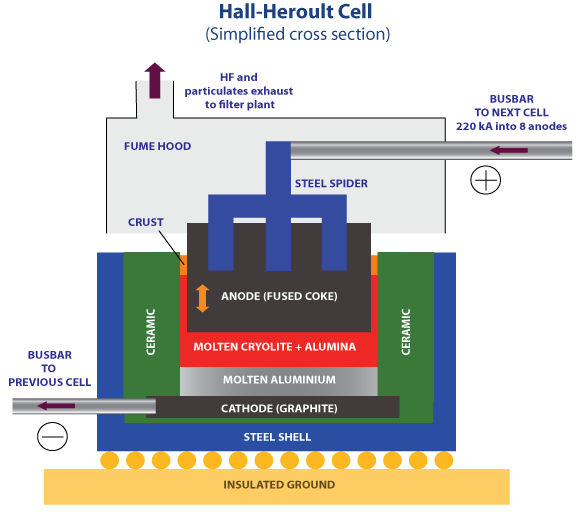
A Hall–Héroult industrial cell

In the Hall–Héroult process, the following simplified reactions take place at the carbon electrodes:

Cathode:

Al^{3+} + 3 e^{−} → Al

Anode:

O^{2-} + C → CO + 2 e^{−}

Overall:

Al_{2}O_{3} + 3 C → 2 Al + 3 CO

In reality, much more CO_{2} is formed at the anode than CO:

2 O^{2-} + C → CO_{2} + 4 e^{−}
2 Al_{2}O_{3} + 3 C → 4 Al + 3 CO_{2}

=== Cryolite and alumina ===
Pure cryolite, Na_{3}AlF_{6}, has a melting point of 1009±1 °C (1848 °F). With a small percentage of alumina dissolved in it, its melting point drops to about 1000 °C (1832 °F). Besides having a relatively low melting point, cryolite is used as an electrolyte because, among other things, it also dissolves alumina well, conducts electricity, dissociates electrolytically at higher voltage than alumina, and is less dense than aluminum at the temperatures required by the electrolysis.

Aluminium fluoride (AlF_{3}) is usually added to the electrolyte. The ratio NaF/AlF_{3} is called the cryolite ratio and it is 3 in pure cryolite. In industrial production, AlF_{3} is added so that the cryolite ratio is 2–3 to further reduce the melting point, so that the electrolysis can happen at temperatures between 940 and 980 °C (1700 to 1800 °F). The density of liquid aluminum is 2.3 g/ml at temperatures between 950 and 1000 °C (1750° to 1830 °F). The density of the electrolyte should be less than 2.1 g/ml, so that the molten aluminum separates from the electrolyte and settles properly to the bottom of the electrolysis cell. In addition to AlF_{3}, other additives like lithium fluoride may be added to alter different properties (melting point, density, conductivity etc.) of the electrolyte.

The mixture is electrolysed by passing a low voltage (under 5 V) direct current at 100–300 kA through it. This causes liquid aluminium to be deposited at the cathode, while the oxygen from the alumina combines with carbon from the anode to produce mostly carbon dioxide.

The theoretical minimum energy requirement for this process is 6.23 kWh/(kg of Al), but it commonly requires 15.37 kWh.

=== Cell operation ===
Cells in factories are operated 24 hours per day so that the molten material in them will not solidify. Temperature within the cell is maintained via electrical resistance. Oxidation of the carbon anode increases the electrical efficiency at a cost of consuming the carbon electrodes and producing carbon dioxide.

While solid cryolite is denser than solid aluminium at room temperature, liquid aluminium is denser than molten cryolite at temperatures around 1,000 °C (1,830 °F). The aluminium sinks to the bottom of the electrolytic cell, where it is periodically collected. The liquid aluminium is siphoned every 1 to 3 days to avoid having to use extremely high temperature valves and pumps. Alumina is added to the cells as the aluminum is removed. Collected aluminium from different cells in a factory is finally melted together to ensure uniform product and made into metal sheets. The electrolytic mixture is sprinkled with coke to prevent the anode's oxidation by the oxygen involved.

The cell produces gases at the anode, primarily CO_{2} produced from anode consumption and hydrogen fluoride (HF) from the cryolite and flux (AlF_{3}). In modern facilities, fluorides are almost completely recycled to the cells for reuse. Escaped HF can be neutralized to its sodium salt, sodium fluoride. Particulates are captured using electrostatic or bag filters. The CO_{2} is usually vented into the atmosphere.

Agitation of the molten material in the cell increases its production rate at the expense of an increase in cryolite impurities in the product. Properly designed cells can leverage magnetohydrodynamic forces induced by the electrolysing current to agitate the electrolyte. In non-agitating static pool cells, the impurities either rise to the top of the metallic aluminium, or sink to the bottom, leaving high-purity aluminium in the middle area.

=== Electrodes ===
Electrodes in cells are mostly coke which has been purified at high temperatures. Pitch resin or tar is used as a binder. The materials most often used in anodes, coke and pitch resin, are mainly residues from the petroleum industry and need to be of high enough purity so no impurities end up into the molten aluminum or the electrolyte.

There are two primary anode technologies using the Hall–Héroult process: Söderberg technology and prebaked technology.

In cells using Söderberg or self-baking anodes, there is a single anode per electrolysis cell. The anode is contained within a frame and, as the bottom of the anode turns mainly into CO_{2} during the electrolysis, the anode loses mass and, being amorphous, it slowly sinks within its frame. More material to the top of the anode is continuously added in the form of briquettes made from coke and pitch. The lost heat from the smelting operation is used to bake the briquettes into the carbon form required for the reaction with alumina. The baking process in Söderberg anodes during electrolysis releases more carcinogenic PAHs and other pollutants than electrolysis with prebaked anodes and, partially for this reason, prebaked anode-using cells have become more common in the aluminium industry. More alumina is added to the electrolyte from the sides of the Söderberg anode after the crust on top of the electrolyte mixture is broken.

Prebaked anodes are baked in very large gas-fired ovens at high temperature before being lowered by various heavy industrial lifting systems into the electrolytic solution. There are usually 24 prebaked anodes in two rows per cell. Each anode is lowered vertically and individually by a computer, as the bottom surfaces of the anodes are eaten away during the electrolysis. Compared to Söderberg anodes, computer-controlled prebaked anodes can be brought closer to the molten aluminium layer at the bottom of the cell without any of them touching the layer and interfering with the electrolysis. This smaller distance decreases the resistance caused by the electrolyte mixture and increases the efficiency of prebaked anodes over Söderberg anodes. Prebake technology also has much lower risk of the anode effect (see below), but cells using it are more expensive to build and labor-intensive to use, as each prebaked anode in a cell needs to be removed and replaced once it has been used. Alumina is added to the electrolyte from between the anodes in prebake cells.

Prebaked anodes contain a smaller percentage of pitch, as they need to be more solid than Söderberg anodes. The remains of prebaked anodes are used to make more new prebaked anodes. Prebaked anodes are either made in the same factory where electrolysis happens, or are brought there from elsewhere.

The inside of the cell's bath is lined with cathode made from coke and pitch. Cathodes also degrade during electrolysis, but much more slowly than anodes do, so their purity and maintenance requirements are lower than the anodes. Cathodes are typically replaced every 2–6 years. This requires the whole cell to be shut down.

=== Anode effect ===
The anode effect is a situation where too many gas bubbles form at the bottom of the anode and join, forming a layer. This increases the resistance of the cell, because smaller areas of the electrolyte touch the anode. These areas of the electrolyte and anode heat up when the density of the electric current of the cell focuses to go through only them. This heats up the gas layer and causes it to expand, thus further reducing the surface area where electrolyte and anode are in contact with each other. The anode effect decreases the energy-efficiency and the aluminium production of the cell. It also induces the formation of tetrafluoromethane (CF_{4}) in significant quantities, increases formation of CO and, to a lesser extent, also causes the formation of hexafluoroethane (C_{2}F_{6}). CF_{4} and C_{2}F_{6} are not CFCs, and, although not detrimental to the ozone layer, are still potent greenhouse gases. The anode effect is mainly a problem in Söderberg technology cells, not in prebaked.

== History ==
=== Existing need ===
Aluminium is the most abundant metallic element in the Earth's crust, but it is rarely found in its elemental state. It occurs in many minerals, but its primary commercial source is bauxite, a mixture of hydrated aluminium oxides and compounds of other elements such as iron.

Prior to the Hall–Héroult process, elemental aluminium was made by heating ore along with elemental sodium or potassium in a vacuum. The method was complicated and consumed materials that were in themselves expensive at that time. This meant that the cost to produce the small amount of aluminium made in the early 19th century was very high, higher than for gold or platinum. Bars of aluminium were exhibited alongside the French crown jewels at the Exposition Universelle of 1855, and Emperor Napoleon III of France was said to have reserved his few sets of aluminium dinner plates and eating utensils for his most honored guests.

Production costs using older methods did come down, but when aluminium was selected as the material for the cap/lightning rod to sit atop the Washington Monument in Washington, D.C., upon its completion in 1884, it was still more expensive than silver.

=== Independent discovery ===
The Hall–Héroult process was discovered independently and almost simultaneously in 1886 by the American chemist Charles Martin Hall and by the Frenchman Paul Héroult—both 22 years old. Some authors claim Hall was assisted by his sister Julia Brainerd Hall; however, the extent to which she was involved has been disputed. In 1888, Hall opened the first large-scale aluminium production plant in Pittsburgh. It later became the Alcoa corporation.

In 1997, the Hall–Héroult process was designated a National Historic Chemical Landmark by the American Chemical Society in recognition of the importance of the process in the commercialization of aluminum.

=== Economic impact ===
Aluminium produced via the Hall–Héroult process, in combination with cheaper electric power, helped make aluminium (and incidentally magnesium) an inexpensive commodity rather than a precious metal.

This, in turn, helped make it possible for pioneers like Hugo Junkers to utilize aluminium and aluminium-magnesium alloys to make items like metal airplanes by the thousands, or Howard Lund to make aluminium fishing boats. In 2012 it was estimated that 12.7 tons of CO_{2} emissions are generated per ton of aluminium produced.

In the 20th and 21st century the aluminum industry due to its large-scale requirements for cheap electricity has often been sited in locations where such electricity is available. For example Iceland, a country with no notable bauxite reserves and a population of less than half a million, is the world's twelfth largest aluminum producer due to the availability of cheap and plentiful electricity, particularly hydropower. Similarly Aluminerie Alouette in Sept-Îles, Quebec, is dependent for its electricity needs on the 5,428 MW Churchill Falls Generating Station operated by Churchill Falls (Labrador) Corporation Limited. The company town of Kitimat in British Columbia was built by Alcan to meet the growing demand for aluminum in the postwar era. It makes use of the Kenney Dam built to power the smelters. The Tiwai Point Aluminium Smelter on the South Island of New Zealand consumes some 570 MW of electricity, most of which is supplied by nearby Manapōuri Power Station. This amounts to around a third of the electricity demand of South Island and 13% of that of the entirety of New Zealand. Borssele Nuclear Power Station was built primarily to supply electricity to an aluminum smelter operated by French Pechiney at the time.

== See also ==
- Downs cell
- History of aluminium
- Hoopes process
- Tantalum#Electrolysis, solid oxide Hall–Héroult process
