= Bayer process =

Industrial means of refining bauxite to produce alumina

The Bayer process is the principal industrial means of refining bauxite to produce alumina (aluminium oxide) and was developed by Carl Josef Bayer. Bauxite, the most important ore of aluminium, contains only 30–60% aluminium oxide (Al_{2}O_{3}), the rest being a mixture of silica, various iron oxides, and titanium dioxide. The aluminium oxide must be further purified before it can be refined into aluminium.

The Bayer process is also the main source of gallium as a byproduct despite low extraction yields.

== Process ==
The Bayer process flow diagram

Bauxite ore is a mixture of hydrated aluminium oxides and compounds of other elements such as iron. The aluminium compounds in the bauxite may be present as gibbsite (Al(OH)_{3}), böhmite (γ-AlO(OH)) or diaspore (α-AlO(OH)); the different forms of the aluminium component and the impurities dictate the extraction conditions.

Aluminium oxides and hydroxides are amphoteric, meaning that they are both acidic and basic. The solubility of Al(III) in water is very low but increases substantially at either high or low pH. In the Bayer process, bauxite ore is heated in a pressure vessel along with a sodium hydroxide solution (caustic soda) at a temperature of 150 to 200 °C (302 to 392 °F). At these temperatures, the aluminium is dissolved as sodium aluminate (primarily [Al(OH)_{4}]^{−}) in an extraction process.

After separation of the residue by filtering, gibbsite is precipitated when the liquid is cooled and then seeded with fine-grained aluminium hydroxide crystals from previous extractions. The precipitation may take several days without addition of seed crystals.

The extraction process (digestion) converts the aluminium oxide in the ore to soluble sodium aluminate, NaAlO_{2}, according to the chemical equation:

Al_{2}O_{3}•2H_{2}O+ 2NaOH → 2NaAlO_{2} + 3H_{2}O

This treatment also dissolves silica, forming sodium silicate :

2 NaOH + SiO_{2} → Na_{2}SiO_{3} + H_{2}O

=== Alternate processes ===
The other components of Bauxite, however, do not dissolve. Sometimes, lime is added at this stage to help precipitate additional silica as calcium silicate. The solution is clarified by filtering off the solid impurities, commonly with a rotary sand trap and with the aid of a flocculant such as starch, to remove the fine particles. The undissolved waste after the aluminium compounds are extracted, bauxite tailings, contains iron oxides, silica, calcia, titania and some unreacted alumina. Originally, the alkaline solution was cooled and treated by bubbling carbon dioxide through it, precipitating aluminium hydroxide:

2 NaAlO_{2} + 3 H_{2}O + CO_{2} → 2 Al(OH)_{3} + Na_{2}CO_{3}

In the seeded precipitation process, the sodium aluminate solution is cooled and fine aluminium hydroxide seed crystals are added to promote the precipitation of further aluminium hydroxide:

2 H_{2}O + NaAlO_{2} → Al(OH)_{3} + NaOH

Some of the aluminium hydroxide produced is used in the manufacture of water treatment chemicals such as aluminium sulfate, PAC (Polyaluminium chloride) or sodium aluminate; a significant amount is also used as a filler in rubber and plastics as a fire retardant. Some 90% of the gibbsite produced is converted into aluminium oxide, Al_{2}O_{3}, by heating in rotary kilns or fluid flash calciners to a temperature of about 1,470 K (1,200 °C; 2,190 °F).

2 Al(OH)_{3} → Al_{2}O_{3} + 3 H_{2}O

The left-over, 'spent' sodium aluminate solution is then recycled. Apart from improving the economy of the process, recycling accumulates gallium and vanadium impurities in the liquors, so that they can be extracted profitably.

Organic impurities that accumulate during the precipitation of gibbsite may cause various problems, for example high levels of undesirable materials in the gibbsite, discoloration of the liquor and of the gibbsite, losses of the caustic material, and increased viscosity and density of the working fluid.

For bauxites having more than 10% silica, the Bayer process becomes uneconomic because of the formation of insoluble sodium aluminium silicate, which reduces yield, so another process must be chosen.

1.7–3.3 tonnes (3,800–7,200 lb) of bauxite (corresponding to about 90% of the alumina content of the bauxite) is required to produce 0.91 tonnes (2,000 lb) of aluminium oxide. This is due to a majority of the aluminium in the ore being dissolved in the process. Energy consumption is between 7 to 21 gigajoules per tonne (0.88 to 2.65 kWh/lb) (depending on process), of which most is thermal energy. Over 90% (95-96%) of the aluminium oxide produced is used in the Hall–Héroult process to produce aluminium.

== Waste ==
Red mud is the waste product that is produced in the digestion of bauxite with sodium hydroxide. It has high calcium and sodium hydroxide content with a complex chemical composition, and accordingly is very caustic and a potential source of pollution. The amount of red mud produced is considerable, and this has led scientists and refiners to seek uses for it. It has received attention as a possible source of vanadium. Due to the low extraction yield much of the gallium ends up in the aluminium oxide as an impurity and in the red mud.

One use of red mud is in ceramic production. Red mud dries into a fine powder that contains iron, aluminium, calcium and sodium. It becomes a health risk when some plants use the waste to produce aluminium oxides.

In the United States, the waste is disposed in large impoundments, a sort of reservoir created by a dam. The impoundments are typically lined with clay or synthetic liners. The US does not approve of the use of the waste due to the danger it poses to the environment. The EPA identified high levels of arsenic and chromium in some red mud samples.

=== Ajka alumina plant accident ===
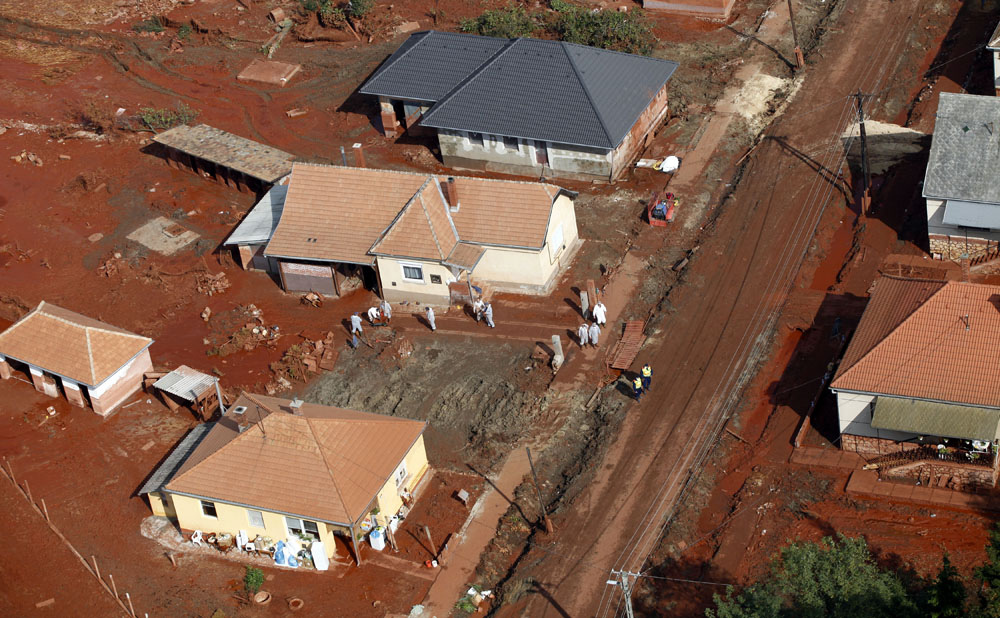
Aftermath of spill

On October 4, 2010, the Ajka alumina plant in Hungary had an incident where the western dam of its red mud reservoir collapsed. The reservoir was filled with 700,000 cubic metres (25 million cubic feet) of a mixture of red mud and water with a pH of 12. The mixture was released into the valley of Torna river and flooded parts of the city of Devecser and the villages of Kolontár and Somlóvásárhely. The incident resulted in 10 deaths, more than a hundred injuries, and contamination in lakes and rivers.

== History ==
In 1859, Henri Étienne Sainte-Claire Deville in France developed a method for making alumina by heating bauxite in sodium carbonate, Na_{2}CO_{3}, at 1,200 °C (2,190 °F), leaching the sodium aluminate formed with water, then precipitating aluminium hydroxide by carbon dioxide, CO_{2}, which was then filtered and dried. This process is known as the Deville–Pechiney process. In 1886, the Hall–Héroult electrolytic aluminium process was invented, and the cyanidation process was invented in 1887.

The Bayer process was invented in 1888 by Carl Josef Bayer. Working in Saint Petersburg, Russia to develop a method for supplying alumina to the textile industry (it was used as a mordant in dyeing cotton), Bayer discovered in 1887 that the aluminium hydroxide that precipitated from alkaline solution was crystalline and could be easily filtered and washed, while that precipitated from acid medium by neutralization was gelatinous and difficult to wash. The industrial success of this process caused it to replace the Deville–Pechiney process, marking the birth of the modern field of hydrometallurgy.

The engineering aspects of the process were improved upon to decrease the cost starting in 1967 in Germany and Czechoslovakia. This was done by increasing the heat recovery and using large autoclaves and precipitation tanks. To more effectively use energy, heat exchangers and flash tanks were used and larger reactors decreased the amount of heat lost. Efficiency was increased by connecting the autoclaves to make operation more efficient.

Today, the process produces nearly all the world's alumina supply as an intermediate step in aluminium production.

== See also ==
- Ajka alumina plant accident
- Deville process
- Hall–Héroult process
- History of aluminium
