= Charles Martin Hall =

American inventor, businessman, and chemist (1863–1914)

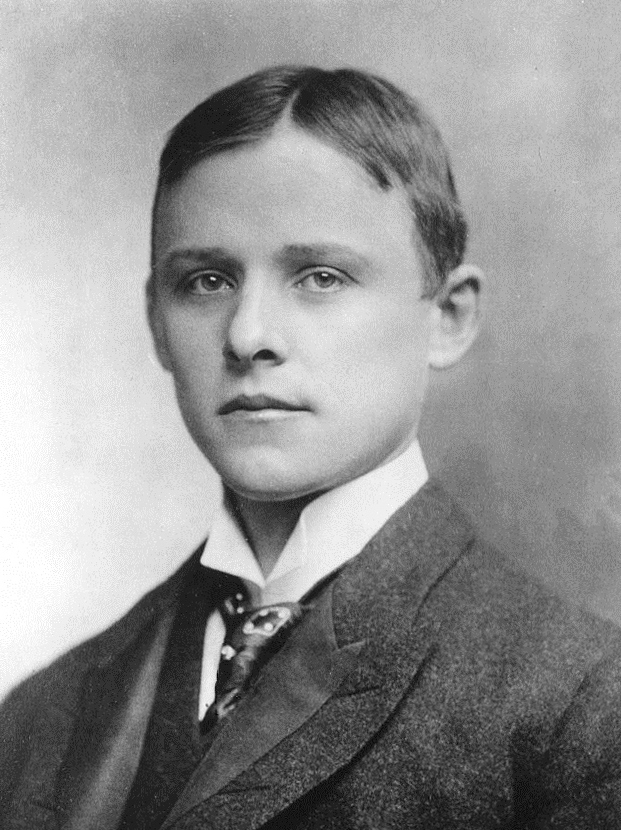
- Charles Martin Hall
- Born: December 6, 1863; Thompson, Ohio, U.S.
- Died: December 27, 1914 (aged 51); Daytona, Florida, U.S.
- Family: Julia Brainerd Hall (sister)
- Engineering career
- Significant advance: Hall–Héroult process
- Awards: Perkin Medal (1911)

Charles Martin Hall (December 6, 1863 – December 27, 1914) was an American inventor, businessman, and chemist. He is best known for his invention in 1886 of an inexpensive method for producing aluminium, which became the first metal to attain widespread use since the prehistoric discovery of iron. He was one of the founders of Alcoa, along with Alfred E. Hunt; Hunt's partner at the Pittsburgh Testing Laboratory, George Hubbard Clapp; Hunt's chief chemist, W. S. Sample; Howard Lash, head of the Carbon Steel Company; Millard Hunsiker, sales manager for the Carbon Steel Company; and Robert Scott, a mill superintendent for the Carnegie Steel Company. Together they raised $20,000 to launch the Pittsburgh Reduction Company, which was later renamed Aluminum Company of America and then shortened to Alcoa.

== Biography ==
=== Early years ===
Charles Martin Hall was born to Herman Bassett Hall and Sophronia H. Brooks on December 6, 1863, in Thompson, Ohio. Charles's father, Herman, graduated from Oberlin College in 1847, and studied for three years at the Oberlin Theological Seminary, where he met his future wife, Sophronia Brooks. They married in 1849, and the next ten years were spent in missionary work in Jamaica, where the first five of their eight children were born. They returned to Ohio in 1860, after the outbreak of the Civil War forced the closing of foreign missions. Charles Hall had two brothers and five sisters; one brother died in infancy. One of his sisters was chemist Julia Brainerd Hall (1859–1925), who helped him in his research.

Hall began his education at home, and he was taught to read at an early age by his mother. At the age of six, he was using his father's 1840s college chemistry book as a reader. At age 8, he entered public school, and progressed rapidly.

Hall's family moved to Oberlin, Ohio, in 1873. He spent three years at Oberlin High School, and a year at Oberlin Academy in preparation for college. During this time, he demonstrated his aptitude for chemistry and invention, carrying out experiments in the kitchen and the woodshed attached to his house. In 1880, at the age of 16, he enrolled at Oberlin College.

In his second term, Hall attended, with considerable interest, Oberlin Professor Frank Fanning Jewett's lecture on aluminum; it was here that Jewett displayed the sample of aluminum he had obtained from Friedrich Wöhler at Göttingen, and remarked, "if anyone should invent a process by which aluminum could be made on a commercial scale, not only would he be a benefactor to the world, but would also be able to lay up for himself a great fortune".

=== Discovery ===
Hall's initial experiments in finding an aluminum reduction process were in 1881. He attempted, unsuccessfully, to produce aluminum from clay by smelting with carbon in contact with charcoal and potassium chlorate. He next attempted to improve the electrolytic methods previously established by investigating cheaper methods to produce aluminum chloride, again unsuccessfully. In his senior year, he attempted to electrolyze aluminum fluoride in water, but was unable to produce aluminum at the cathode.

In 1884, after setting up a homemade coal-fired furnace and bellows in a shed behind the family home, Hall again tried to find a catalyst that would allow him to reduce aluminum with carbon at high temperatures: "I tried mixtures of alumina and carbon with barium salts, with cryolite, and with carbonate of sodium, hoping to get a double reaction by which the final result would be aluminum. I remember buying some metallic sodium and trying to reduce cryolite, but obtained very poor results. I made some aluminum sulphide but found it very unpromising as a source of aluminum then as it has been ever since".

Hall had to fabricate most of his apparatus and prepare his chemicals, and was assisted by his older sister Julia Brainerd Hall. The basic invention, which he discovered on February 23, 1886, involves passing an electric current through a bath of alumina dissolved in cryolite, which results in a puddle of aluminum forming in the bottom of the retort. On July 9, 1886, Hall filed for his first patent. This process was also discovered at nearly the same time by the Frenchman Paul Héroult, and it has come to be known as the Hall–Héroult process.

After failing to find financial backing at home, Hall went to Pittsburgh, where he made contact with noted metallurgist Alfred E. Hunt. They formed the Reduction Company of Pittsburgh, which opened the first large-scale aluminum production plants. The Reduction Company later became the Aluminum Company of America, then Alcoa. Hall was a major stockholder, and became wealthy.

The Hall–Héroult process eventually resulted in reducing the price of aluminum by a factor of 200, making it affordable for many practical uses. By 1900, annual production reached about 8,000 short tons (7.3 million kilograms). As of 2022, more aluminum is produced annually than all other non-ferrous metals combined.

Hall is sometimes suggested to be the originator of the American spelling of "aluminum", but that spelling was used briefly by Humphry Davy in the early 1800s and was the spelling in Noah Webster's Dictionary of 1828. "Aluminium" was used widely in the United States until 1895 or 1900, and "aluminum" was not officially adopted by the American Chemical Society until 1925. Hall's early patents use the spelling "aluminium". In the United Kingdom and other countries using British spelling, only the spelling "aluminium" is now used. The spelling in virtually all other languages is analogous to the "-ium" ending.

=== Later years and death ===
Hall continued his research and development for the rest of his life and was granted 22 US patents, most on aluminum production. He served on the Oberlin College Board of Trustees. He retained powerful influence over the business decisions at Alcoa until his death.

Hall died, unmarried and childless, on December 27, 1914, twenty-one days after he had reached the age of 51, in Daytona, Florida. He was buried in Westwood Cemetery in Oberlin. Hall and Héroult had both been born and both died in the same years.

In his last will and testament, Hall left the vast majority of his fortune to charity. His generosity contributed to the establishment of the Harvard–Yenching Institute, a leading foundation dedicated to advancing higher education in Asia in the humanities and social sciences.

== Awards and honors ==
Hall was elected to the American Philosophical Society in 1898. He won the Perkin Medal, the highest award that the American section of the Society of Chemical Industry bestows, in 1911. In 1997, the production of aluminum by electrochemistry discovered by Hall was designated as a National Historic Chemical Landmark by the American Chemical Society.

Hall eventually became one of Oberlin College's most prominent benefactors, and an aluminum statue of him exists on the campus. Because of its light weight, Hall's statue was once known for its frequent changes of location, often due to student pranks. Today the statue is glued to a large granite block and sits more permanently on the second floor of Oberlin's science center, where students continue to decorate Hall with appropriate trappings on holidays and other occasions.

The Jewett home is preserved in Oberlin as the Oberlin Heritage Center. The center features an exhibit called Aluminum: The Oberlin Connection, which includes a re-creation of Hall's 1886 woodshed experiment. The Hall House is also preserved in Oberlin, although the woodshed was demolished long ago.

== Patents ==
- US Patent 400,664, Process of reducing aluminium from its fluoride salts by electrolysis — C. M. Hall, applied 1886, granted 1889. TIFF Image of page from USPTO.

== See also ==
- History of aluminium
