= Paul Héroult =

French scientist

Paul L.T. Héroult
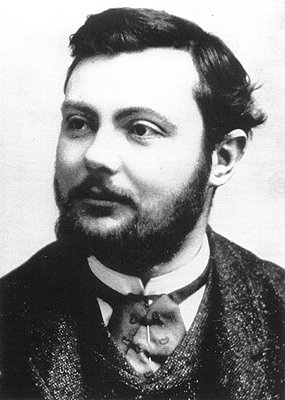
- Paul L.T. Héroult
- Born: 10 April 1863; Thury-Harcourt
- Died: 9 May 1914 (aged 51); Antibes
- Known for: Aluminium electrolysis

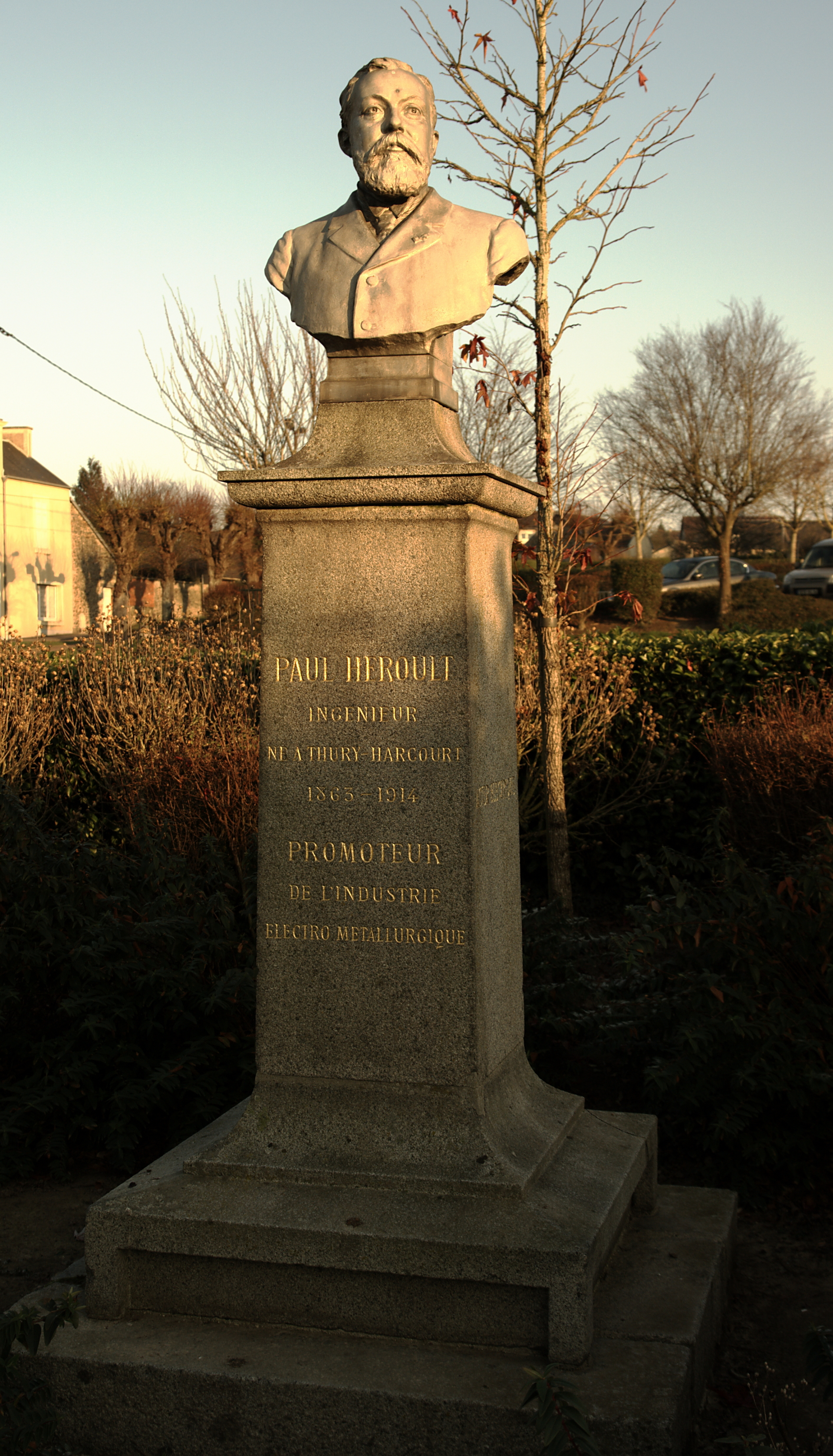
Bust of Heroult in Thury-Harcourt

Paul (Louis-Toussaint) Héroult (10 April 1863 – 9 May 1914) was a French scientist. He was one of the inventors of the Hall-Héroult process for smelting aluminium, and developed the first successful commercial electric arc furnace. He lived in Thury-Harcourt, Normandy.

== Life and career ==
Paul Héroult read Henri Sainte-Claire Deville's treatise on aluminium, when he was 15 years old. At that time, aluminium was as expensive as silver and was used mostly for luxury items and jewellery. Héroult wanted to make it cheaper. He succeeded in doing so when he discovered the electrolytic aluminium process in 1886. The same year, in the United States, Charles Martin Hall (1863–1914) was discovering the same process. Because of this, the process was called the Hall–Heroult process.

Héroult's second most important contribution is the first commercially successful electric arc furnace (EAF) for steel in 1900. The Héroult furnace gradually replaced the giant smelters for the production of a variety of steels. In 1905, Paul Héroult was invited to the United States as a technical adviser to several companies, and in particular to the United States Steel Corporation and the Halcomb Steel Company. Halcomb installed the first Héroult furnace in the US.

The invention of the electric arc furnace probably began when Humphry Davy discovered the carbon arc in 1800. Then in 1878 Carl Wilhelm Siemens patented, constructed and operated both direct and indirect EAFs. Commercial use still needed to wait for larger supplies of electricity and better carbon electrodes.

Paul Héroult is renowned for other major inventions, among them a self-supporting conduit still used to bring water down from mountain heights and across rivers to hydraulic power plants, avoiding the need to build expensive bridges.

Christian Bickert said of him

Paul Héroult had none of the attributes of the traditional scholar.

He was highstrung, unruly, occasionally hard and insolent; he did not fit the image of wise, disciplined men of science. He loved games, the company of women, travels by land and sea; he was a free spirit in an impetuous body. No comparison with the austere scientist, struggling with stubborn mysteries. His discoveries were not the result of long sleepless nights spent in a laboratory, or of complicated scientific demonstrations. Héroult loved life, and could not have borne such restrictions. Instead, his inventions appeared suddenly, out of the blue, a stroke of common sense, or of genius, sometimes during a lively game of billiards, his favorite pastime.

Héroult died on 9 May 1914; he was 51 years and 29 days old.

== See also ==
- Crucible Industries, Halcomb merged into Crucible in 1900
- Methods of steel production:
  - Metallurgy cementation process
  - Crucible steel processes
  - Open-hearth furnace process, the Siemens-Martin process
- Steel industry
  - Crucible steel
  - Blast furnace
  - Steel mill or Steelworks
- History of aluminium

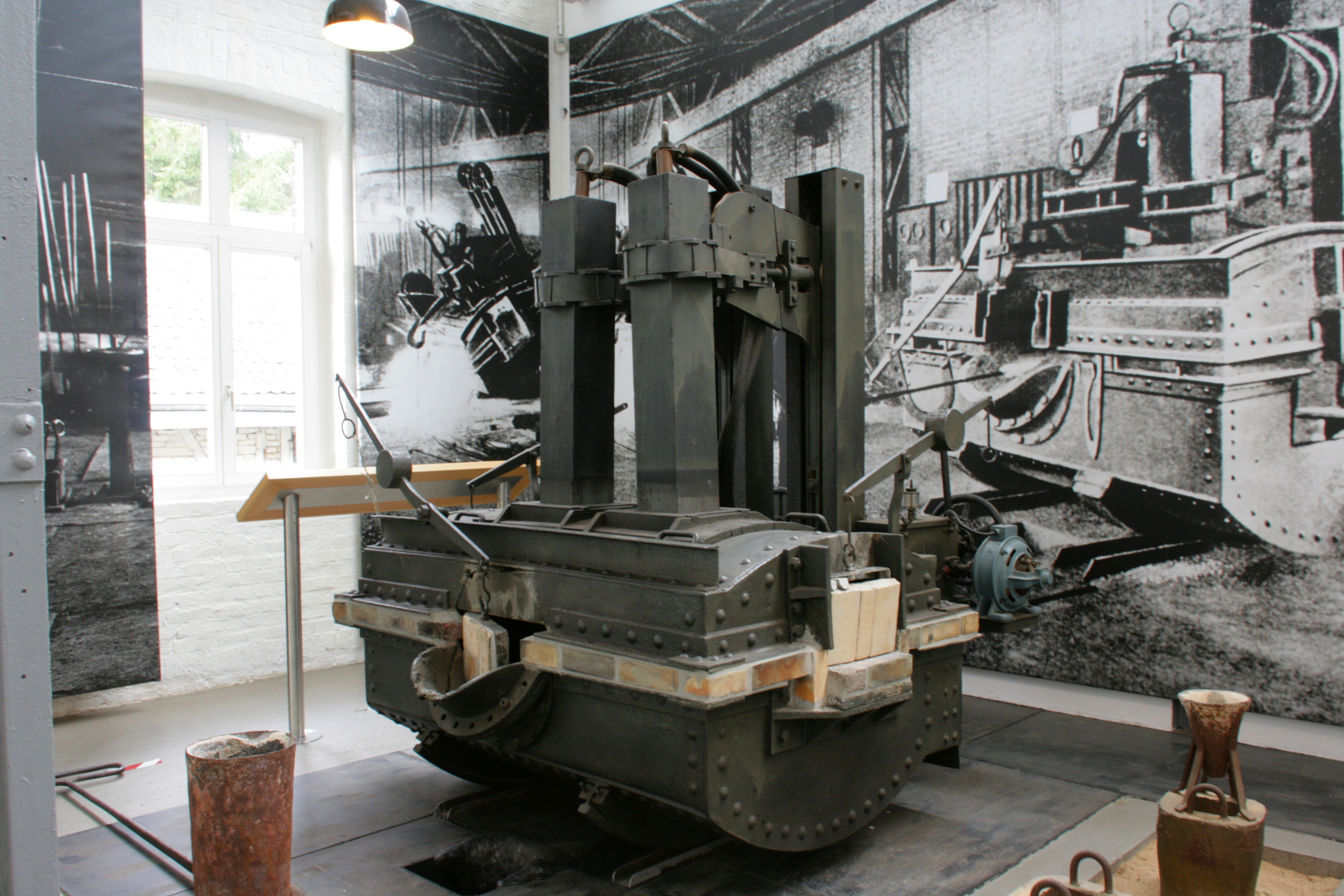
1905 Heroult electric arc DC furnace

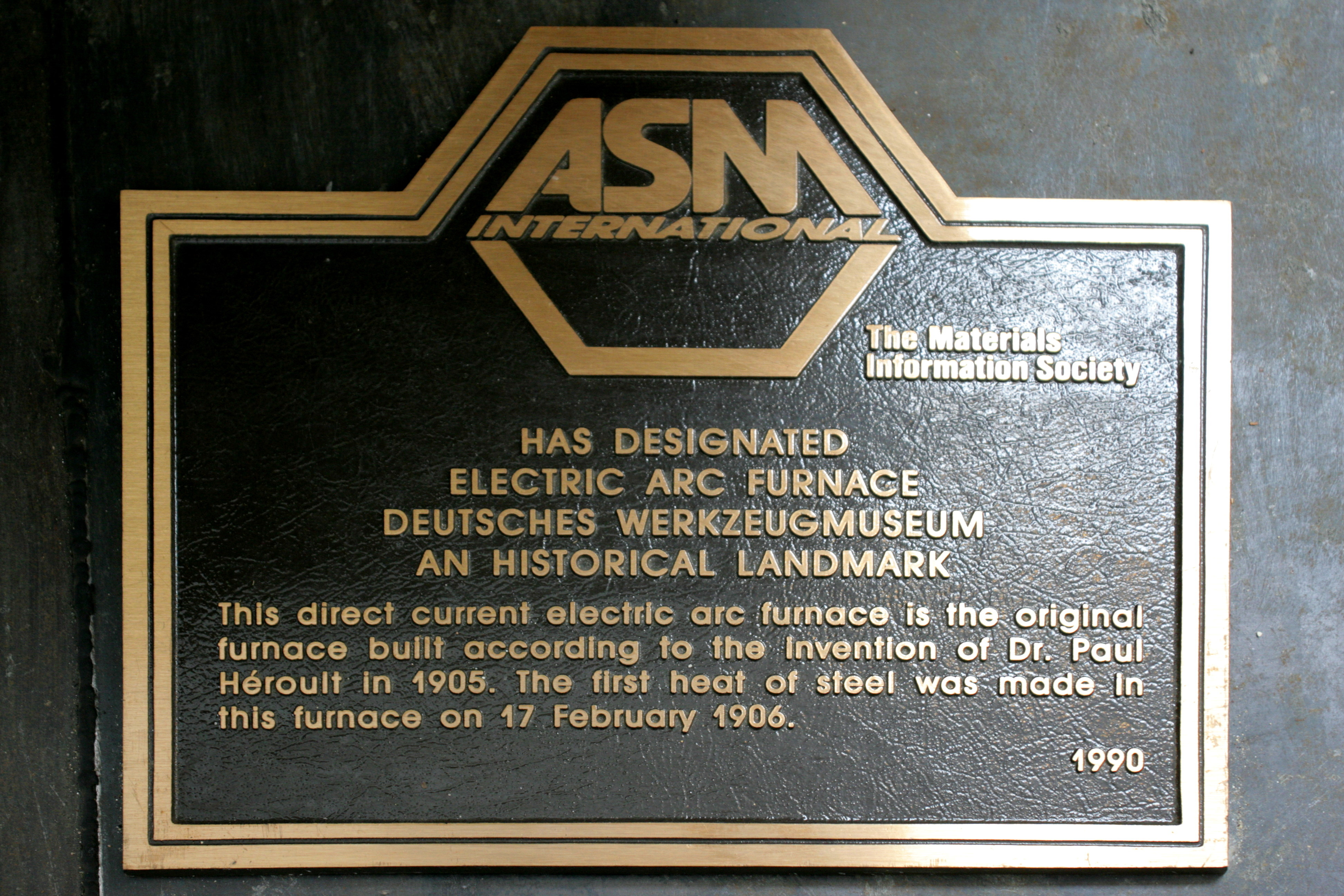
1905 Heroult electric arc DC furnace
