= Salindres =

- Commune
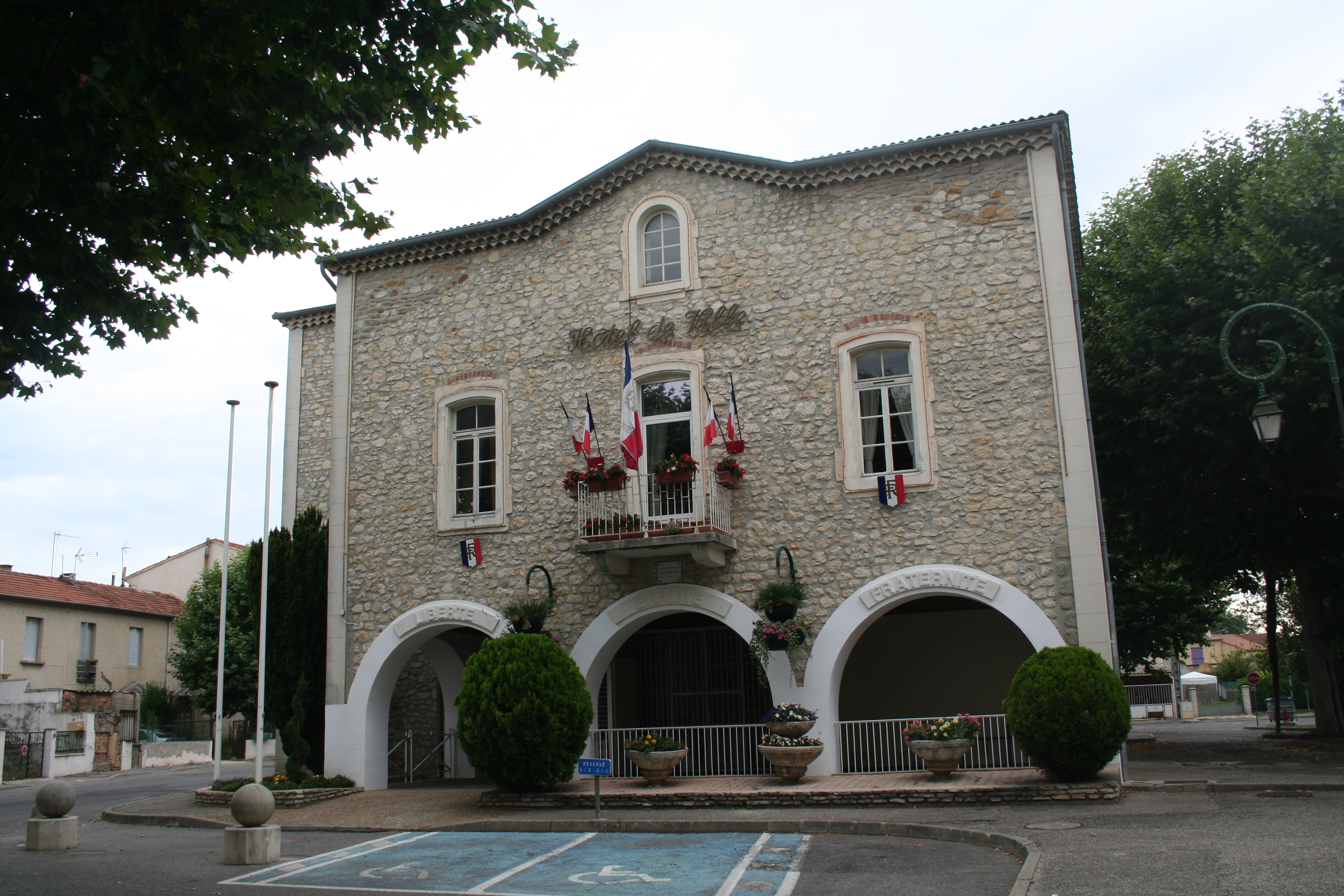
- The town hall in Salindres

- Coat of arms
- Location of Salindres
- Location within France Location within Occitanie
- Coordinates: 44°10′19″N 4°09′30″E
- Country: France
- Region: Occitania
- Department: Gard
- Arrondissement: Alès
- Canton: Alès-2
- Intercommunality: Alès Agglomération

Government
  - Mayor (2022–2026): Etienne Malachanne
- Area^{1}: 11.53 km^{2} (4.45 sq mi)
- Elevation: 188 m (617 ft)
- Highest elevation: 241 m (791 ft)
- Lowest elevation: 148 m (486 ft)
- Population (2023): 3,648
  - Density: 316.4/km^{2} (819.5/sq mi)
- Time zone: UTC+01:00 (CET)
  - Summer (DST): UTC+02:00 (CEST)
- INSEE/Postal code: 30305 /30340
- ^{1} French Land Register data, which excludes lakes, ponds, glaciers > 1 km^{2} (0.386 sq mi or 247 acres) and river estuaries.

Salindres (French pronunciation: [salɛ̃dʁ]) is a commune in the Gard department in southern France. The composer and conductor Roger Dumas (1897–1951) was born, in Salindres.

== Geography ==
=== Climate ===
Salindres has a hot-summer Mediterranean climate (Köppen climate classification Csa). The average annual temperature in Salindres is 14.0 °C (57.2 °F). The average annual rainfall is 1,092.1 mm (43.00 in) with September as the wettest month. The temperatures are highest on average in July, at around 23.4 °C (74.1 °F), and lowest in January, at around 5.8 °C (42.4 °F). The second highest temperature ever recorded in Salindres was 44.0 °C (111.2 °F) on 1 August 1947, the hottest August day on record for Frances was 44.4 °C (111.9 °F) on 23 August 2023; the coldest temperature ever recorded was −14.5 °C (5.9 °F) on 12 February 1956.

Climate data for Salindres (1991−2020 normals, extremes 1915−present)
Month	Jan	Feb	Mar	Apr	May	Jun	Jul	Aug	Sep	Oct	Nov	Dec	Year
Record high °C (°F)	25.0 (77.0)	24.3 (75.7)	27.0 (80.6)	33.0 (91.4)	38.0 (100.4)	42.0 (107.6)	40.2 (104.4)	44.4 (111.9)	36.7 (98.1)	32.4 (90.3)	26.0 (78.8)	20.7 (69.3)	44.4 (111.9)
Mean daily maximum °C (°F)	10.5 (50.9)	12.2 (54.0)	16.2 (61.2)	19.0 (66.2)	23.0 (73.4)	27.6 (81.7)	30.9 (87.6)	30.7 (87.3)	25.5 (77.9)	19.8 (67.6)	14.2 (57.6)	10.9 (51.6)	20.0 (68.0)
Daily mean °C (°F)	5.8 (42.4)	6.7 (44.1)	10.0 (50.0)	12.8 (55.0)	16.5 (61.7)	20.5 (68.9)	23.4 (74.1)	23.1 (73.6)	18.8 (65.8)	14.5 (58.1)	9.5 (49.1)	6.4 (43.5)	14.0 (57.2)
Mean daily minimum °C (°F)	1.1 (34.0)	1.2 (34.2)	3.9 (39.0)	6.5 (43.7)	10.0 (50.0)	13.5 (56.3)	15.8 (60.4)	15.6 (60.1)	12.1 (53.8)	9.2 (48.6)	4.8 (40.6)	1.9 (35.4)	8.0 (46.4)
Record low °C (°F)	−13.6 (7.5)	−14.5 (5.9)	−11.4 (11.5)	−3.8 (25.2)	−0.2 (31.6)	1.0 (33.8)	4.8 (40.6)	6.2 (43.2)	2.0 (35.6)	−3.2 (26.2)	−7.9 (17.8)	−13.0 (8.6)	−14.5 (5.9)
Average precipitation mm (inches)	83.9 (3.30)	56.2 (2.21)	71.7 (2.82)	85.0 (3.35)	85.7 (3.37)	54.7 (2.15)	45.3 (1.78)	53.9 (2.12)	166.0 (6.54)	158.3 (6.23)	142.2 (5.60)	89.2 (3.51)	1,092.1 (43.00)
Average precipitation days (≥ 1.0 mm)	7.2	5.5	5.7	7.6	7.8	5.4	4.2	4.9	6.0	8.5	8.7	7.0	78.4
Source: Météo-France

== Population ==
Historical population

Year	Pop.	±% p.a.
1793	300	—
1821	369	+0.74%
1846	548	+1.59%
1872	2,051	+5.21%
1901	2,551	+0.76%
1926	2,816	+0.40%
1946	3,126	+0.52%
1962	3,889	+1.37%
1968	3,845	−0.19%

Year	Pop.	±% p.a.
1975	3,666	−0.68%
1982	3,459	−0.83%
1990	3,213	−0.92%
1999	3,055	−0.56%
2007	3,056	+0.00%
2012	3,190	+0.86%
2017	3,494	+1.84%
2023	3,648	+0.72%

Source: EHESS and INSEE (1968-2023)

== See also ==
- Communes of the Gard department
