= Native aluminium =

Mineral (as opposed to the chemical element)

Aluminium
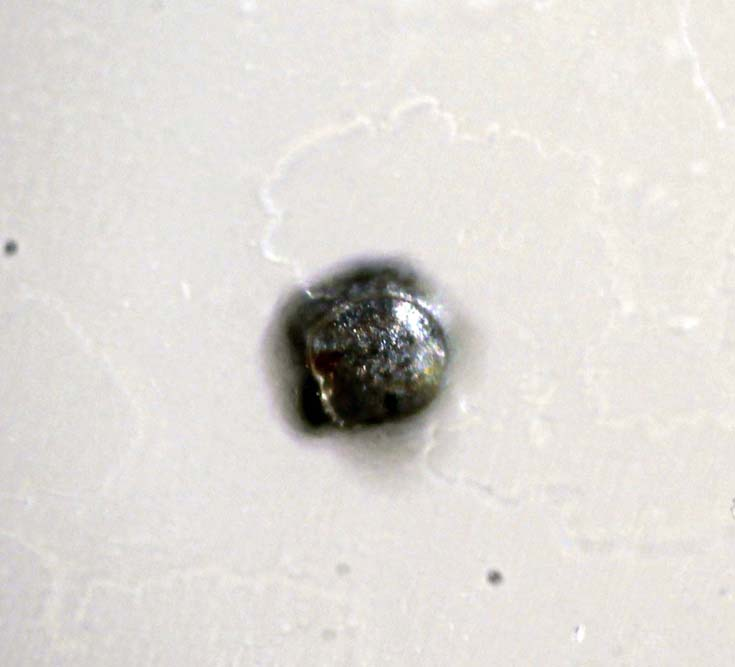
- Tiny speck of native aluminium

General
- Category: Native metal
- Formula: Al
- Crystal system: Cubic
- Crystal class: Hexoctahedral (m3̅m); H-M symbol: (4/m 3̅ 2/m)
- Space group: Fm3̅m

Identification
- Color: Grayish-white
- Crystal habit: Granular to massive, platy, scaly
- Tenacity: Malleable
- Mohs scale hardness: 2 - 3.5
- Luster: Metallic
- Diaphaneity: Opaque

Native aluminium (IMA1980-085a) is a natural occurrence of aluminium metal. Its (co)-type localities are the Billeekh intrusion and the dike OB-255, Sakha Republic.

In a gabbro-dolerite of the Billeekh intrusion it occurs with copper, zinc, tin, lead, cadmium, iron, antimony and moissanite. In the occurrence in the Tolbachik volcano in Russia it occurs with magnetite, ilmenite, hematite, pyrite and native iron. In the Getang, Guizhou Province, China, it occurs with copper, sulfur and jarosite.
