= Aluminium compounds =

Chemical compounds containing aluminium

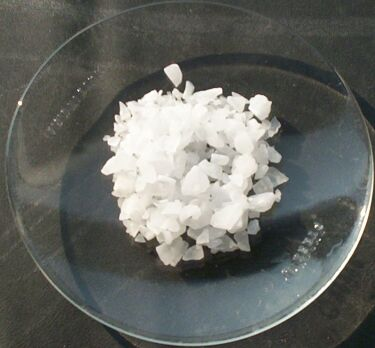
Sample of aluminium sulfate hexadecahydrate, Al_{2}(SO_{4})_{3}·16H_{2}O.

Aluminium (British and IUPAC spellings) or aluminum (North American spelling) combines characteristics of pre- and post-transition metals. Since it has few available electrons for metallic bonding, like its heavier group 13 congeners, it has the characteristic physical properties of a post-transition metal, with longer-than-expected interatomic distances. Furthermore, as Al^{3+} is a small and highly charged cation, it is strongly polarizing and aluminium compounds tend towards covalency; this behaviour is similar to that of beryllium (Be^{2+}), an example of a diagonal relationship. However, unlike all other post-transition metals, the underlying core under aluminium's valence shell is that of the preceding noble gas, whereas for gallium and indium it is that of the preceding noble gas plus a filled d-subshell, and for thallium and nihonium it is that of the preceding noble gas plus filled d- and f-subshells. Hence, aluminium does not suffer the effects of incomplete shielding of valence electrons by inner electrons from the nucleus that its heavier congeners do. Aluminium's electropositive behavior, high affinity for oxygen, and highly negative standard electrode potential are all more similar to those of scandium, yttrium, lanthanum, and actinium, which have ds^{2} configurations of three valence electrons outside a noble gas core: aluminium is the most electropositive metal in its group. Aluminium also bears minor similarities to the metalloid boron in the same group; AlX_{3} compounds are valence isoelectronic to BX_{3} compounds (they have the same valence electronic structure), and both behave as Lewis acids and readily form adducts. Additionally, one of the main motifs of boron chemistry is regular icosahedral structures, and aluminium forms an important part of many icosahedral quasicrystal alloys, including the Al–Zn–Mg class.

== Reactions of aluminium ==
Aluminium reacts with most nonmetals upon heating, forming compounds such as aluminium nitride (AlN), aluminium sulfide (Al_{2}S_{3}), and the aluminium halides (AlX_{3}). It also forms a wide range of intermetallic compounds involving metals from every group on the periodic table. Aluminium has a high chemical affinity to oxygen, which renders it suitable for use as a reducing agent in the thermite reaction. A fine powder of aluminium reacts explosively on contact with liquid oxygen; under normal conditions, however, aluminium forms a thin oxide layer that protects the metal from further corrosion by oxygen, water, or dilute acid, a process termed passivation. This layer is destroyed by contact with mercury due to amalgamation or with salts of some electropositive metals. As such, the strongest aluminium alloys are less corrosion-resistant due to galvanic reactions with alloyed copper, and aluminium's corrosion resistance is greatly reduced by aqueous salts, particularly in the presence of dissimilar metals. In addition, although the reaction of aluminium with water at temperatures below 280 °C is of interest for the production of hydrogen, commercial application of this fact has challenges in circumventing the passivating oxide layer, which inhibits the reaction, and in storing the energy required to regenerate the aluminium.

Primarily because it is corroded by dissolved chlorides, such as common sodium chloride, household plumbing is never made from aluminium. However, because of its general resistance to corrosion, aluminium is one of the few metals that retains silvery reflectance in finely powdered form, making it an important component of silver-colored paints. Aluminium mirror finish has the highest reflectance of any metal in the 200–400 nm (UV) and the 3,000–10,000 nm (far IR) regions; in the 400–700 nm visible range it is slightly outperformed by tin and silver and in the 700–3000 nm (near IR) by silver, gold, and copper.

In hot concentrated hydrochloric acid, aluminium reacts with water with evolution of hydrogen, and in aqueous sodium hydroxide or potassium hydroxide at room temperature to form aluminates—protective passivation under these conditions is negligible. The reaction with aqueous alkali is often written:

Al + NaOH + H_{2}O → NaAlO_{2} + 3/2 H_{2}

although the aluminium species in solution is probably instead the hydrated tetrahydroxoaluminate anion, [Al(OH)_{4}]^{−} or [Al(H_{2}O)_{2}(OH)_{4}]^{−}.

Oxidizing acids do not effectively attack high-purity aluminium because the oxide layer forms and protects the metal; aqua regia will nevertheless dissolve aluminium. This allows aluminium to be used to store reagents such as nitric acid, concentrated sulfuric acid, and some organic acids.

== Inorganic compounds ==
The vast majority of compounds, including all aluminium-containing minerals and all commercially significant aluminium compounds, feature aluminium in the oxidation state +3. The coordination number of such compounds varies, but generally Al^{3+} is either six- or four-coordinate. Almost all compounds of aluminium(III) are colorless.

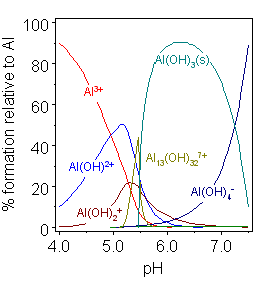
Aluminium hydrolysis as a function of pH. Coordinated water molecules are omitted. (Data from Baes and Mesmer)

In aqueous solution, Al^{3+} exists as the hexaaqua cation [Al(H_{2}O)_{6}]^{3+}, which has an approximate pK_{a} of 10^{−5}. Such solutions are acidic as this cation can act as a proton donor, progressively hydrolysing to [Al(H_{2}O)_{5}(OH)]^{2+}, [Al(H_{2}O)_{4}(OH)_{2}]^{+}, and so on. As pH increases these mononuclear species begin to aggregate together by the formation of hydroxide bridges, forming many oligomeric ions, such as the Keggin ion [Al_{13}O_{4}(OH)_{24}(H_{2}O)_{12}]^{7+}. The process ends with precipitation of aluminium hydroxide, Al(OH)_{3}. This is useful for clarification of water, as the precipitate nucleates on suspended particles in the water, hence removing them. Increasing the pH even further leads to the hydroxide dissolving again as aluminate, [Al(H_{2}O)_{2}(OH)_{4}]^{−}, is formed. Aluminium hydroxide forms both salts and aluminates and dissolves in acid and alkali, as well as on fusion with acidic and basic oxides:

Al_{2}O_{3} + 3 SiO_{2} Al_{2}(SiO_{3})_{3}
Al_{2}O_{3} + CaO Ca(AlO_{2})_{2}

This behaviour of Al(OH)_{3} is termed amphoterism, and is characteristic of weakly basic cations that form insoluble hydroxides and whose hydrated species can also donate their protons. Further examples include Be^{2+}, Zn^{2+}, Ga^{3+}, Sn^{2+}, and Pb^{2+}; indeed, gallium in the same group is slightly more acidic than aluminium. One effect of this is that aluminium salts with weak acids are hydrolysed in water to the aquated hydroxide and the corresponding nonmetal hydride: aluminium sulfide yields hydrogen sulfide, aluminium nitride yields ammonia, and aluminium carbide yields methane. Aluminium cyanide, acetate, and carbonate exist in aqueous solution but are unstable as such; only incomplete hydrolysis takes place for salts with strong acids, such as the halides, nitrate, and sulfate. For similar reasons, anhydrous aluminium salts cannot be made by heating their "hydrates": hydrated aluminium chloride is in fact not AlCl_{3}·6H_{2}O but [Al(H_{2}O)_{6}]Cl_{3}, and the Al–O bonds are so strong that heating is not sufficient to break them and form Al–Cl bonds instead:

2[Al(H_{2}O)_{6}]Cl_{3} Al_{2}O_{3} + 6 HCl + 9 H_{2}O

All four trihalides are well known. Unlike the structures of the three heavier trihalides, aluminium fluoride (AlF_{3}) features six-coordinate aluminium, which explains its involatility and insolubility as well as high heat of formation. Each aluminium atom is surrounded by six fluorine atoms in a distorted octahedral arrangement, with each fluorine atom being shared between the corners of two octahedra in a structure related to but distorted from that of ReO_{3}. Such {AlF_{6}} units also exist in complex fluorides such as cryolite, Na_{3}AlF_{6}, but should not be considered as [AlF_{6}]^{3−} complex anions as the Al–F bonds are not significantly different in type from the other M–F bonds. Such differences in coordination between the fluorides and heavier halides are not unusual, occurring in Sn^{IV} and Bi^{III} as well for example; even bigger differences occur between CO_{2} and SiO_{2}. AlF_{3} melts at 1,290 °C (2,354 °F) and is made by reaction of aluminium oxide with hydrogen fluoride gas at 700 °C (1,292 °F).

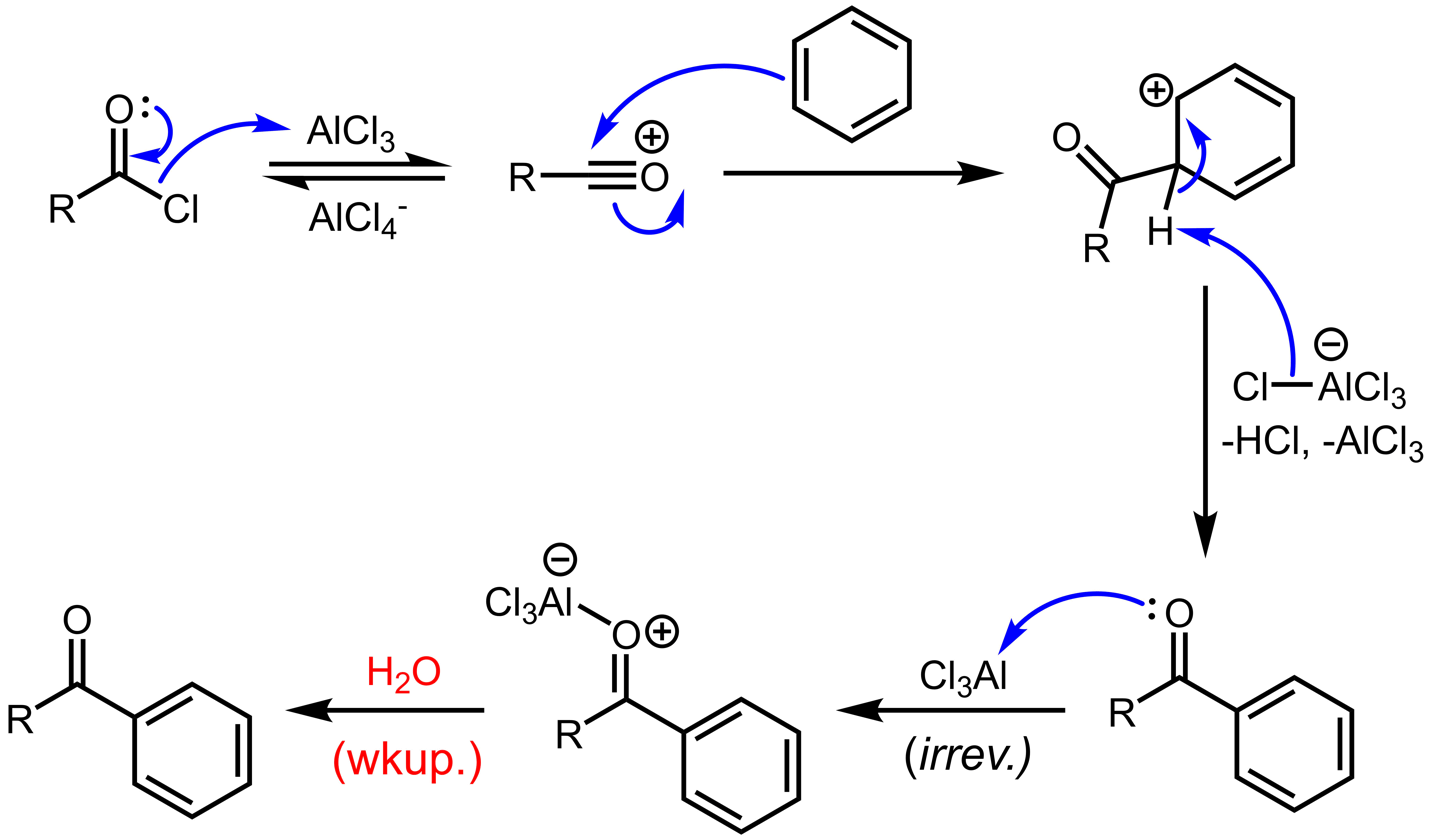
Mechanism of the Friedel–Crafts acylation, using AlCl_{3} as a catalyst

With heavier halides, the coordination numbers are lower. The other trihalides are dimeric or polymeric with tetrahedral four-coordinate aluminium centers. Aluminium trichloride (AlCl_{3}) has a layered polymeric structure below its melting point of 192.4 °C (378 °F), but transforms on melting to Al_{2}Cl_{6} dimers with a concomitant increase in volume by 85% and a near-total loss of electrical conductivity. These still predominate in the gas phase at low temperatures (150–200 °C), but at higher temperatures increasingly dissociate into trigonal planar AlCl_{3} monomers similar to the structure of BCl_{3}. Aluminium tribromide and aluminium triiodide form Al_{2}X_{6} dimers in all three phases and hence do not show such significant changes of properties upon phase change. These materials are prepared by treating aluminium with the halogen. The aluminium trihalides form many addition compounds or complexes; their Lewis acidic nature makes them useful as catalysts for the Friedel–Crafts reactions. Aluminium trichloride has major industrial uses involving this reaction, such as in the manufacture of anthraquinones and styrene; it is also often used as the precursor for many other aluminium compounds and as a reagent for converting nonmetal fluorides into the corresponding chlorides (a transhalogenation reaction).

AlCl_{3} + 3 LiZ → 3 LiCl + AlZ_{3} (Z = R, NR_{2}, N=CR_{2})
AlCl_{3} + 4 LiZ → 3 LiCl + LiAlZ_{4} (Z = R, NR_{2}, N=CR_{2}, H)
BF_{3} + AlCl_{3} → AlF_{3} + BCl_{3}

Aluminium forms one stable oxide with the chemical formula Al_{2}O_{3}, commonly called alumina. It can be found in nature in the mineral corundum, α-alumina; there is also a γ-alumina phase. As corundum is very hard (Mohs hardness 9), has a high melting point of 2,045 °C (3,713 °F), has very low volatility, is chemically inert, and a good electrical insulator, it is often used in abrasives (such as toothpaste), as a refractory material, and in ceramics, as well as being the starting material for the electrolytic production of aluminium. Sapphire and ruby are impure corundum contaminated with trace amounts of other metals. The two main oxide-hydroxides, AlO(OH), are boehmite and diaspore. There are three main trihydroxides: bayerite, gibbsite, and nordstrandite, which differ in their crystalline structure (polymorphs). Many other intermediate and related structures are also known. Most are produced from ores by a variety of wet processes using acid and base. Heating the hydroxides leads to formation of corundum. These materials are of central importance to the production of aluminium and are themselves extremely useful. Some mixed oxide phases are also very useful, such as spinel (MgAl_{2}O_{4}), Na-β-alumina (NaAl_{11}O_{17}), and tricalcium aluminate (Ca_{3}Al_{2}O_{6}, an important mineral phase in Portland cement).

The only stable chalcogenides under normal conditions are aluminium sulfide (Al_{2}S_{3}), selenide (Al_{2}Se_{3}), and telluride (Al_{2}Te_{3}). All three are prepared by direct reaction of their elements at about 1,000 °C (1,832 °F) and quickly hydrolyse completely in water to yield aluminium hydroxide and the respective hydrogen chalcogenide. As aluminium is a small atom relative to these chalcogens, these have four-coordinate tetrahedral aluminium with various polymorphs having structures related to wurtzite, with two-thirds of the possible metal sites occupied either in an orderly (α) or random (β) fashion; the sulfide also has a γ form related to γ-alumina, and an unusual high-temperature hexagonal form where half the aluminium atoms have tetrahedral four-coordination and the other half have trigonal bipyramidal five-coordination. Four pnictides, aluminium nitride (AlN), aluminium phosphide (AlP), aluminium arsenide (AlAs), and aluminium antimonide (AlSb), are known. They are all III-V semiconductors isoelectronic to silicon and germanium, all of which but AlN have the zinc blende structure. All four can be made by high-temperature (and possibly high-pressure) direct reaction of their component elements.

=== Rarer oxidation states ===
Although the great majority of aluminium compounds feature Al^{3+} centers, compounds with lower oxidation states are known and are sometimes of significance as precursors to the Al^{3+} species.

==== Aluminium(I) ====
AlF, AlCl, AlBr, and AlI exist in the gaseous phase when the respective trihalide is heated with aluminium, and at cryogenic temperatures. Their instability in the condensed phase is due to their ready disproportionation to aluminium and the respective trihalide: the reverse reaction is favored at high temperature (although even then they are still short-lived), explaining why AlF_{3} is more volatile when heated in the presence of aluminium, as is aluminium when heated in the presence of AlCl_{3}.

A stable derivative of aluminium monoiodide is the cyclic adduct formed with triethylamine, Al_{4}I_{4}(NEt_{3})_{4}. Also of theoretical interest but only of fleeting existence are Al_{2}O and Al_{2}S. Al_{2}O is made by heating the normal oxide, Al_{2}O_{3}, with silicon at 1,800 °C (3,272 °F) in a vacuum. Such materials quickly disproportionate to the starting materials.

==== Aluminium(II) ====
Very simple Al(II) compounds are invoked or observed in the reactions of Al metal with oxidants. For example, aluminium monoxide, AlO, has been detected in the gas phase after explosion and in stellar absorption spectra. More thoroughly investigated are compounds of the formula R_{4}Al_{2} which contain an Al–Al bond and where R is a large organic ligand.

== Organoaluminium compounds and related hydrides ==
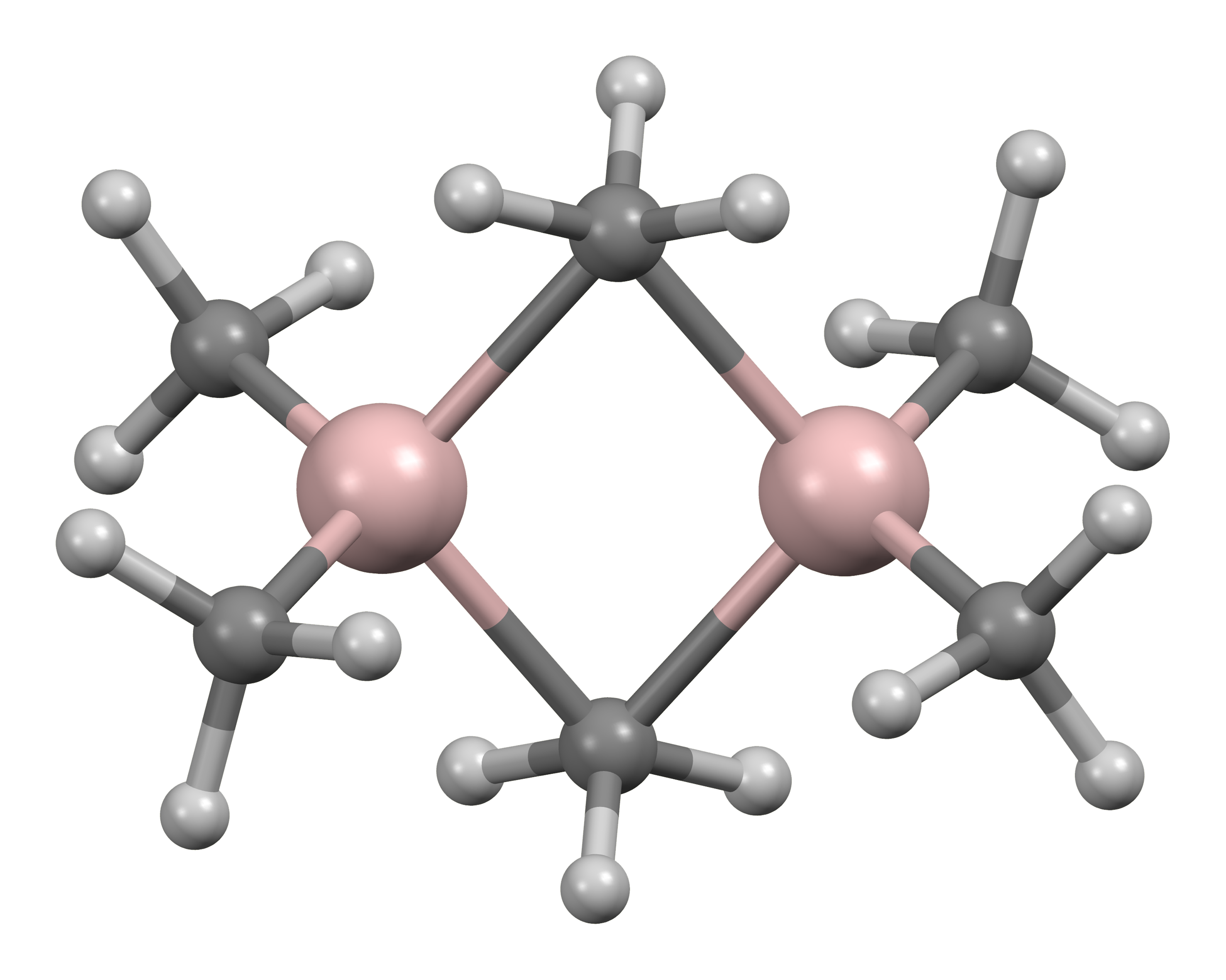
Structure of trimethylaluminium, a compound that features five-coordinate carbon.

A variety of compounds of empirical formula AlR_{3} and AlR_{1.5}Cl_{1.5} exist. The aluminium trialkyls and triaryls are reactive, volatile, and colorless liquids or low-melting solids. They catch fire spontaneously in air and react with water, thus necessitating precautions when handling them. They often form dimers, unlike their boron analogues, but this tendency diminishes for branched-chain alkyls (e.g. Pr^{i}, Bu^{i}, Me_{3}CCH_{2}); for example, triisobutylaluminium exists as an equilibrium mixture of the monomer and dimer. These dimers, such as trimethylaluminium (Al_{2}Me_{6}), usually feature tetrahedral Al centers formed by dimerization with some alkyl group bridging between both aluminium atoms. They are hard acids and react readily with ligands, forming adducts. In industry, they are mostly used in alkene insertion reactions, as discovered by Karl Ziegler, most importantly in "growth reactions" that form long-chain unbranched primary alkenes and alcohols, and in the low-pressure polymerization of ethene and propene. There are also some heterocyclic and cluster organoaluminium compounds involving Al–N bonds.

The industrially most important aluminium hydride is lithium aluminium hydride (LiAlH_{4}), which is used in as a reducing agent in organic chemistry. It can be produced from lithium hydride and aluminium trichloride:

4 LiH + AlCl_{3} → LiAlH_{4} + 3 LiCl

The simplest hydride, aluminium hydride or alane, is not as important. It is a polymer with the formula (AlH_{3})_{n}, in contrast to the corresponding boron hydride that is a dimer with the formula (BH_{3})_{2}.

== Bibliography ==
- Greenwood, Norman N.; Earnshaw, Alan (1997). Chemistry of the Elements (2nd ed.). Butterworth-Heinemann. doi:10.1016/C2009-0-30414-6. ISBN 978-0-08-037941-8.
