= Metal Stocks in Society report =

Metal Stocks in Society: Scientific Synthesis
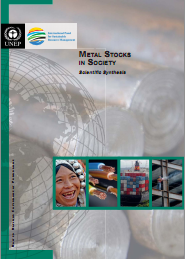
- Type: Independent scientific assessment
- Website: www.resourcepanel.org

The report Metal Stocks in Society: Scientific Synthesis was the first of six scientific assessments on global metals to be published by the International Resource Panel (IRP) of the United Nations Environment Programme. The IRP provides independent scientific assessments and expert advice on a variety of areas, including:

- The volume of selected raw material reserves and how efficiently these resources are being used
- The lifecycle-long environmental impacts of products and services created and consumed around the globe
- options to meet human and economic needs with fewer or cleaner resources.

== About the report ==
Metals were an early priority for the International Resource Panel since little was known about them, their impacts, their economic importance or their scarcity. The report aimed to calculate the amount of metals present in society and assess the potential for utilising in-use stock to offset demand for virgin metal. Knowing how much metal stock there is in use, and how long the lifespan of the metal is, can help planners know when these metal stocks will enter recycling or waste streams. It suggested that these 'mines above ground' had the growing potential for future metals supply; the authors found that it is about 50 kg of above-ground copper for every person on earth, and more than two tons of iron per capita. However, they noted that enormous disparities in global metals stocks existed between developed and developing nations including Brazil, China and India.

Calculating ‘anthropogenic stocks’ of metals already in use in society is a precursor to stimulating efforts to increase recycling. The authors reported that very little information is presently known about different metals, making it difficult for policymakers to develop and plan recycling systems. However, what is known is that recycling can not only reduce negative impacts on the environment but also save energy. For example, 95% of the energy used to make aluminium from bauxite ore is saved by using recycled material.

The authors quantified per capita stocks of the following metals, for some countries (stocks were mostly quantified for developed countries but data was also available for some developing nations).

- Major engineering metals: aluminium, copper, iron, lead, steel, stainless steel, zinc
- Precious metals: gold, palladium, platinum, rhodium, silver
- Specialty metals: antimony, cadmium, chromium, cobalt, magnesium, manganese, mercury, molybdenum, nickel, tin, titanium, tungsten

Extant in-use metal-stock estimations for the major engineering metals:

Metal	Number of estimates	Percentage of all estimates	Global per capita stock (kg)	MDC per capita stock	LDC per capita stock
Aluminium	9	7.4	80	350–500	35
Copper	34	27.0	35–55	140–300	30–40
Iron	13	10.7	2200	7000–14000	2000
Lead	20	16.4	8	20–150	1–4
Steel		0.8		7085	
Stainless steel	5	4.1		80–180	15
Zinc	14	11.5	n/a	80–200	20–40

== Reasons for recycling ==
Some primary stocks of rare but useful metals are already running low. For example, rhenium only occurs at seven parts per billion in the Earth’s crust, making it one of the rarest elements on the planet. However, its high melting point of 3,186 °C makes it valuable in the manufacture of jet engines. Demand for the metal is rising, with increasing air travel, but its rarity means increasing extraction is not simple. This is where recycling comes in; rhenium is one of the few metals that has witnessed a rise in recycling rates. It is likely that recycling will become a more viable option than extraction for other metals in future, saving energy, cutting greenhouse gases emitted to the atmosphere and reducing negative impacts on the environment.
