= PAQUID cohort =

The PAQUID (or Paquid) cohort is a group of 3,777 individuals aged 65 years or older who were studied from 1988 until 2004. Researchers selected participants for the group from at least 91 different areas of southwestern France to study the effects of different environmental, behavioral, and social vectors of age-related medical conditions and diseases. One of the major research goals was to determine some of the causes of dementia and Alzheimer's disease, such as the correlation between the levels of aluminum in drinking water and the occurrence of dementia.

The studies were conducted by the Université Victor-Segalen, Bordeaux 2 (UB2) in Bordeaux, France.

The source of the term is "Personnes Agées QUID," which can be loosely translated from French and Latin as "What about the elderly?"

== See also ==
- Cohort study
- Alzheimer's disease
- dementia
