= Diagonal relationship =

Relationship between elements on the periodic table

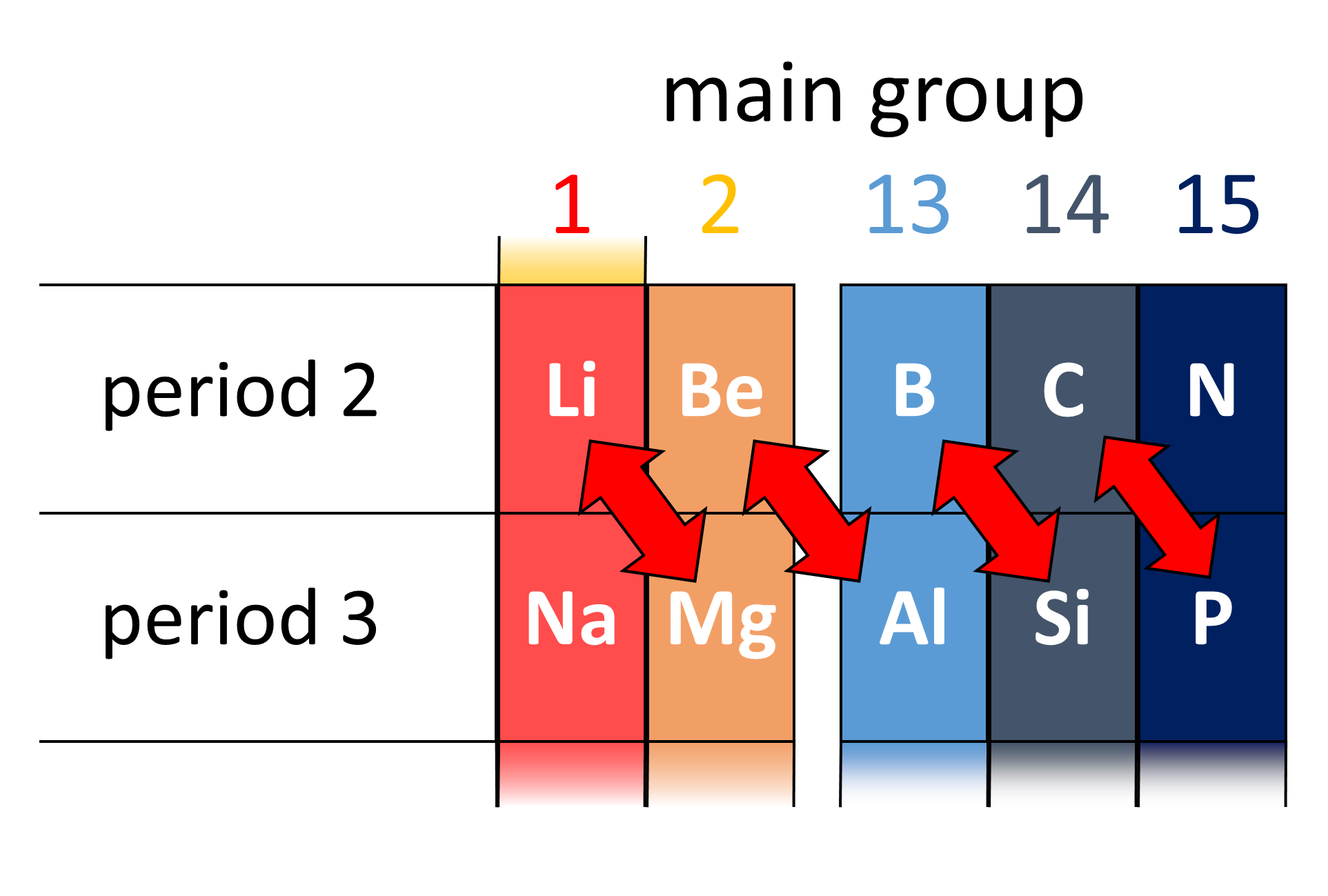
Pictorial representation of examples of diagonal relationship.

In chemistry, a diagonal relationship is said to exist between certain pairs of diagonally adjacent elements in the second and third periods (first 20 elements) of the periodic table. These pairs (lithium (Li) and magnesium (Mg), beryllium (Be) and aluminium (Al), boron (B) and silicon (Si), etc.) exhibit similar properties; for example, boron and silicon are both semiconductors, form halides that are hydrolysed in water and have acidic oxides.

Further diagonal similarities have also been suggested for carbon-phosphorus and nitrogen-sulfur, along with extending the Li-Mg and Be-Al relationships down into the transition elements (such as scandium).

The organization of elements on the periodic table into horizontal rows and vertical columns makes certain relationships more apparent (periodic law). Moving rightward and descending the periodic table have opposite effects on atomic radii of isolated atoms. Moving rightward across the period decreases the atomic radii of atoms, while moving down the group will increase the atomic radii.

Similarly, on moving rightward a period, the elements become progressively less basic and more electronegative, whereas on moving down a group the elements become more basic and less electronegative. Thus, on both descending a period and crossing a group by one element, the changes "cancel" each other out, and elements with similar properties which have similar chemistry are often found – the atomic radius, electronegativity, properties of compounds (and so forth) of the diagonal members are similar. Diagonal relationship is present in some specific pairs of second period and third period element that is lithium and magnesium, beryllium and aluminium, boron and silicon.

The reasons for the existence of diagonal relationships are not fully understood, but charge density is a factor. For example, Li^{+} is a small cation with a +1 charge and Mg^{2+} is somewhat larger with a +2 charge, so the ionic potential of each of the two ions is roughly the same. It was revealed by an examination that the charge density of lithium is much closer to that of magnesium than to those of the other alkali metals. Using the Li–Mg pair (under room temperature and pressure):

1. When combined with oxygen under standard conditions, Li and Mg form only normal oxides whereas Na forms peroxide and metals below Na, in addition, form superoxides.
2. Li is the only group 1 element which forms a stable nitride, Li_{3}N. Mg, as well as other group 2 elements, also form nitrides.
3. Lithium carbonate, phosphate and fluoride are sparingly soluble in water. The corresponding group 2 salts are insoluble. (Think lattice and solvation energies).
4. Both Li and Mg form covalent organometallic compounds. LiMe and MgMe_{2} (cf. Grignard reagents) are both valuable synthetic reagents. The other group 1 and group 2 analogues are ionic and extremely reactive (and hence difficult to manipulate).
5. Chlorides of both Li and Mg are deliquescent (absorb moisture from surroundings) and soluble in alcohol and pyridine. Lithium chloride, like magnesium chloride (MgCl_{2}·6H_{2}O) separates out from hydrated crystal LiCl·2H_{2}O.
6. Lithium carbonate and magnesium carbonate are both unstable and can produce corresponding oxides and carbon dioxide when they are heated.
