= Aluminium carbonate =

Aluminium Carbonate
Names
- IUPAC name Dialuminium Tricarbonate

Identifiers
CAS Number	14455-29-9
3D model (JSmol)	Interactive image
ChemSpider	10606614
ECHA InfoCard	100.034.930
PubChem CID	10353966
UNII	1GA689N629
CompTox Dashboard (EPA)	DTXSID30891680 DTXSID40201756, DTXSID30891680
- InChI: InChI=1S/3CH2O3.2Al/c3*2-1(3)4;;/h3*(H2,2,3,4);;/q;;;2*+3/p-6 Key: PPQREHKVAOVYBT-UHFFFAOYSA-H
- SMILES: C(=O)([O-])[O-].C(=O)([O-])[O-].C(=O)([O-])[O-].[Al+3].[Al+3]

Properties
Chemical formula	Al_{2}(CO_{3})_{3}
Molar mass	233.99 g/mol
Appearance	white powder, unstable
Density	3.14 g/cm^{3}
Solubility in water	reacts

Structure
Crystal structure	orthorhombic
Space group	Fdd2
Lattice constant	a = 21.989 Å, b = 10.176 Å, c = 4.4230 Å
Lattice volume (V)	989.7
Formula units (Z)	8
- Except where otherwise noted, data are given for materials in their standard state (at 25 °C [77 °F], 100 kPa). verify (what is ?) Infobox references

Aluminium carbonate (Al_{2}(CO_{3})_{3}), is a carbonate of aluminium. The neutral carbonate is relatively unknown compared to its related compounds, such as the basic sodium aluminium carbonate mineral dawsonite (NaAlCO_{3}(OH)_{2}) and hydrated basic aluminium carbonate minerals scarbroite (Al_{5}(CO_{3})(OH)_{13}•5(H_{2}O)) and hydroscarbroite (Al_{14}(CO_{3})_{3}(OH)_{36}•nH_{2}O).

== Preparation ==
For many years there was no evidence for the existence of a simple aluminium carbonate, Al_{2}(CO_{3})_{3}, as the combination of Al^{3+} and carbonates are sufficiently alkaline to precipitate aluminium hydroxide and produce carbon dioxide:

$$\ce{2[Al(H2O)6]^{3+}(aq) + 3CO3^{2-}(aq) -> 2Al(OH)3 (s) + 3CO2 (g) + 9H2O (l)}$$

However, in 2023, Al_{2}(CO_{3})_{3} was produced by heating aluminium oxide at 2300 °C under 24 GPa of carbon dioxide. The resulting solid is stable in air and at room temperature.

Some minerals contain both aluminium and carbonate. Dawsonite has the formula NaAlCO_{3}(OH)_{2}. Hydrotalcites, both synthetic and natural, are layered metal hydroxides comprised in part of aluminium and carbonate.

Surface carbonate species readily form upon exposure of aluminium oxide to CO_{2}.
