= Aluminium telluride =

Inorganic compound

Names
- Other names μ-Telluride(ditelluroxo)dialuminium, Dialuminium tritelluride, Aluminium (III) telluride

Identifiers
CAS Number	12043-29-7
3D model (JSmol)	Interactive image
ChemSpider	22797847
ECHA InfoCard	100.031.751
EC Number	234-939-4
PubChem CID	12674524
CompTox Dashboard (EPA)	DTXSID601014260
- InChI: InChI=1S/2Al.3Te Key: RETRTUZSQWNRQG-UHFFFAOYSA-N; InChI=1S/2Al.3Te/q2*+3;3*-2 Key: IBHHFWUKPAWXSJ-UHFFFAOYSA-N
- SMILES: [Te]=[Al][Te][Al]=[Te]

Properties
Chemical formula	Al_{2}Te_{3}
Molar mass	436.76 g/mol
Appearance	dark grey to black solid
Density	4.5 g/cm^{3}
Melting point	895 °C (1,643 °F; 1,168 K)
Solubility in water	decomposes
- Except where otherwise noted, data are given for materials in their standard state (at 25 °C [77 °F], 100 kPa). Infobox references

Aluminium telluride is an inorganic chemical compound of aluminium and tellurium with the chemical formula Al_{2}Te_{3}.

== Preparation ==
Aluminium telluride can be obtained by direct combination of aluminium metal with elemental tellurium at 1,000 °C (1,270 K; 1,830 °F).

2 Al + 3 Te → Al_{2}Te_{3}

== Properties ==
Aluminium telluride is a very air-sensitive dark grey to black solid. It has a band gap of 2.4 eV. The compound decomposes in humid air.

In its pure form, it occurs in at least two phases. The orange-red low-temperature (α) modification transforms into the yellow high-temperature (β) form at 720 °C (993 K; 1,328 °F). The conversion from β- to α-Al_{2}Te_{3}, which is associated with such a small enthalpy change that it cannot be observed with differential thermal analysis, takes place after prolonged annealing just below the conversion point. The α form crystallizes in the monoclinic crystal system with the lattice constants a = 13.885 Å, b = 7.189 Å, c = 4.246 Å, p = 90.21° and an additional superstructure. The β form has a monoclinic crystal structure with space group P2_{1}/c and the lattice constants a = 7.181(1) Å, b = 12.848(3) Å, c = 14.167(3) Å, and b= 90.04(2)°. This form represents a separate structure type. The tellurium atoms form a hexagonal dense packing parallel to the (001) plane; one-third of the tetrahedral vacancies are occupied by aluminium atoms, whereby the tetrahedral vacancies are occupied in such a way that a layered structure is formed. Some sources also report another form of the defect wurtzite type.

== Uses ==
Aluminium telluride is used in the semiconductor industry. It can also be used to produce hydrogen telluride by reacting with hydrogen chloride.

Al_{2}Te_{3} + 6 HCl → 3 H_{2}Te + 2 AlCl_{3}
