= Aluminium sulfide =

Aluminum sulfide
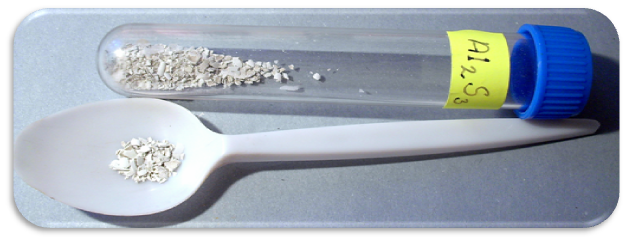

Names
- Other names Aluminium sulfide

Identifiers
CAS Number	1302-81-4
3D model (JSmol)	Interactive image
ChemSpider	140154
ECHA InfoCard	100.013.736
EC Number	215-109-0
PubChem CID	16684788
UNII	04PI6P2Z18
CompTox Dashboard (EPA)	DTXSID80893235
- InChI: InChI=1S/2Al.3S/q2*+3;3*-2 Key: COOGPNLGKIHLSK-UHFFFAOYSA-N; InChI=1/2Al.3S/q2*+3;3*-2 Key: COOGPNLGKIHLSK-UHFFFAOYAY
- SMILES: [Al+3].[Al+3].[S-2].[S-2].[S-2]

Properties
Chemical formula	Al_{2}S_{3}
Molar mass	150.158 g/mol
Appearance	gray solid
Density	2.02 g/cm^{3}
Melting point	1,100 °C (2,010 °F; 1,370 K)
Boiling point	1,500 °C (2,730 °F; 1,770 K) sublimes
Solubility in water	decomposes
Solubility	insoluble in acetone

Structure
Crystal structure	trigonal

Thermochemistry
Heat capacity (C)	105.1 J/mol K
Std molar entropy (S^{⦵}_{298})	116.9 J/mol K
Std enthalpy of formation (Δ_{f}H^{⦵}_{298})	−724 kJ/mol

Hazards
- GHS labelling
Pictograms	(GHS02: Flammable) (GHS06: Toxic)
Signal word	Danger
NFPA 704 (fire diamond)	4 0 2 W
- Safety data sheet (SDS)
- Except where otherwise noted, data are given for materials in their standard state (at 25 °C [77 °F], 100 kPa). verify (what is ?) Infobox references

Aluminum sulfide is a chemical compound with the formula Al_{2}S_{3}. This colorless species has an interesting structural chemistry, existing in several forms. The material is sensitive to moisture, hydrolyzing to hydrated aluminum oxides/hydroxides. This can begin when the sulfide is exposed to the atmosphere. The hydrolysis reaction generates gaseous hydrogen sulfide (H_{2}S).

== Crystal structure ==
More than six crystalline forms of aluminum sulfide are known and only some are listed below. Most of them have rather similar, wurtzite-like structures, and differ by the arrangement of lattice vacancies, which form ordered or disordered sublattices.

Form	Symmetry	Space group	a (A)	c (A)	ρ (g/cm^{3})
α	Hexagonal	P6_{1}	6.423	17.83	2.32
β	Hexagonal	P6_{3}mc	3.579	5.829	2.495
γ	Trigonal		6.47	17.26	2.36
δ	Tetragonal	I4_{1}/amd	7.026	29.819	2.71

The β and γ phases are obtained by annealing the most stable α-Al_{2}S_{3} phase at several hundred degrees Celsius. Compressing aluminum sulfide to 2–65 bar results in the δ phase where vacancies are arranged in a superlattice of tetragonal symmetry.

Unlike Al_{2}O_{3}, in which the Al(III) centers occupy octahedral holes, the more expanded framework of Al_{2}S_{3} stabilizes the Al(III) centers into one third of the tetrahedral holes of a hexagonally close-packed arrangement of the sulfide anions. At higher temperature, the Al(III) centers become randomized to give a "defect wurtzite" structure. And at still higher temperatures stabilize the γ-Al_{2}S_{3} forms, with a structure akin to γ-Al_{2}O_{3}.

Molecular derivatives of Al_{2}S_{3} are not known. Mixed Al-S-Cl compounds are however known. Al_{2}Se_{3} and Al_{2}Te_{3} are also known.

== Preparation ==
Aluminum sulfide is readily prepared by ignition of the elements

2 Al + 3 S → Al_{2}S_{3}

This reaction is extremely exothermic and it is not necessary or desirable to heat the whole mass of the sulfur-aluminum mixture; (except possibly for very small amounts of reactants). The product will be created in a fused form; it reaches a temperature greater than 1,100 °C and may melt its way through steel. The cooled product is very hard.
