= Transhalogenation =

Chemical reaction

Transhalogenation is a substitution reaction in which the halide of a halide compound is exchanged for another halide.

== Finkelstein reaction ==
A common method is halide metathesis. An example is the conversion of alkyl chloride into alkyl fluoride:

C_{3}H_{5}-Cl + NaF → R-F + NaCl

This kind of reaction is called Finkelstein reaction. However, it is also possible, for example, to produce phosphorus fluoride compounds by transhalogenating chlorine, bromine or iodine bound to phosphorus with a metal fluoride.

== Details and biological use ==
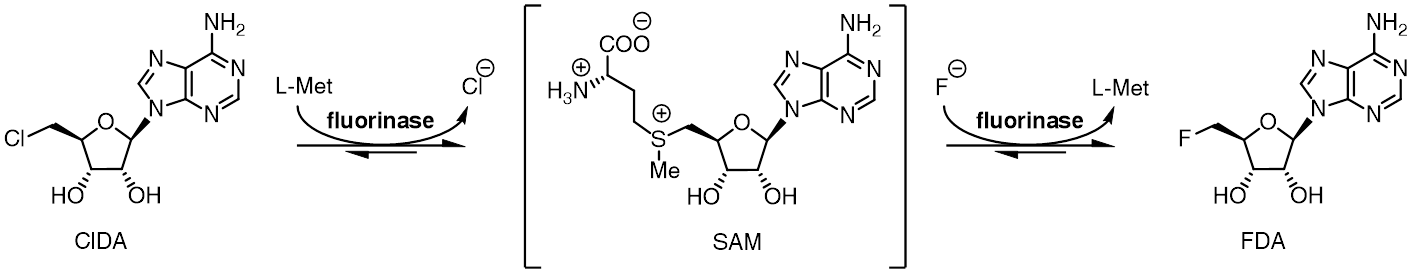
An enzyme-catalyzed transhalogenation.

As a halogen source for transhalogenation, metal halides (such as sodium fluoride or lithium fluoride) are often used, but also the use of onium halides is possible. Transhalogenation has been described as a gentle method for the synthesis of fluoroorganylboranes. It is also possible to produce aryliodides from the corresponding aryl chlorides or aryl bromides.

One investigation showed a possibility to perform transhalogenation by means of genetically modified enzymes (haloalkanes dehalogenases, HLDs).

== Literature ==
- Yoel Sasson (2009-12-15). "Formation of Carbon-Halogen Bonds (Cl, Br, I)". PATai's Chemistry of Functional Groups. Chichester, UK: John Wiley & Sons, Ltd. pp. pat0011. doi:10.1002/9780470682531.pat0011. ISBN 978-0-470-68253-1.
- "transhalogenation - Wiktionary". 27 October 2018.
