= Aluminium halide =

The aluminium halides are:

- Aluminium bromide
- Aluminium chloride
- Aluminium fluoride
- Aluminium iodide
- Aluminium monobromide
- Aluminium monochloride
- Aluminium monofluoride
- Aluminium monoiodide

Ions also exist

- aluminium tetrafluoride AlF^{−}_{4}
