= Aluminium(I) compounds =

Class of chemical compounds

In chemistry, aluminium(I) refers to monovalent aluminium (+1 oxidation state) in both ionic and covalent bonds. Along with aluminium(II), it is an extremely unstable form of aluminium.

While late Group 13 elements such as thallium and indium prefer the +1 oxidation state, aluminium(I) is rare. Aluminium does not experience the inert-pair effect, a phenomenon where valence s electrons are poorly shielded from nuclear charge due to the presence of filled d and f orbitals. As such, aluminium (III) (Al^{3+}) is the much more common oxidation state for aluminium.

Aluminium(I) compounds are both prone to disproportionation and difficult to prepare. At standard conditions, they readily oxidize to the aluminium(III) form.

== Characteristics ==
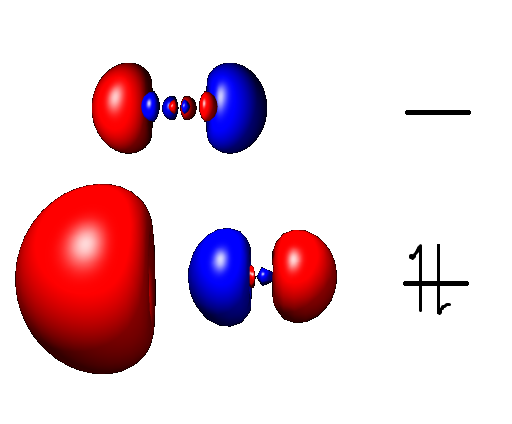
HOMO and LUMO Orbitals for AlCl.

Al(I) appears to be red, as solutions of AlBr and AlCl in organic solvents are both red. The presence of this color implies a relatively small HOMO–LUMO gap that is accessible by green light.

The geometry of compounds can be determined by analysis of the fine structure of the electronic spectra. Matrix isolation spectroscopy prevents disproportionation of aluminium monohalides and thus allows for the measuring of transitional vibrations as well as reactivity with molecules such as O_{2}.

Analysis by ^{27}Al NMR spectroscopy of AlCl, AlBr, and AlI in toluene/diethyl ether at room temperature reveal two signals: one very broad signal at δ = 100-130 ppm (regardless of the halogen), and one at higher field strength (AlCl: δ = + 30, AlBr: δ = + 50, AlI: δ = + 80). The first signal corresponds to a donor-stabilized four-coordinate aluminium species, while the identity of the latter is inconclusive.

== Monohalides ==
The aluminium(I) cation reacts with hydrogen halides to form the following aluminium monohalides:

- aluminium monofluoride (AlF)
- aluminium monochloride (AlCl)
- aluminium monobromide (AlBr)
- aluminium monoiodide (AlI)

These compounds are only thermodynamically stable at high temperatures and low pressures in the singlet ground state. However, decomposition can be prevented by making disproportionation kinetically unfavorable. Under cold temperatures (below 77 K), disproportionation is slow enough that the AlCl solid can be kept for long periods of time.

=== Synthesis ===
AlCl is synthesized by reaction of liquid aluminium with gaseous HCl at 1200 K and 0.2 mbar to yield gaseous AlCl and hydrogen gas. At 77 K, AlCl is a dark red solid which turns black upon disproportionation at temperatures higher than 180 K. At temperatures under 77 K and dissolved in a matrix of polar and non-polar solvents, it exists as a metastable solution whose reactivity can be studied. AlBr, a red oil, is prepared similarly from liquid aluminium and gaseous HBr.

Al (l) + HCl (g) → AlCl (g) + 1/_{2} H_{2} (g)

Due to the nature of HF, which possesses a bond much stronger than that of its congeners, AlF is synthesized instead by the comproportionation of Al and AlF_{3} which are pressed and mixed into pellets. The pellets are then loaded into a graphite furnace and heated to 1050 K.

2 Al (s) + AlF_{3} (s) → 3 AlF (g)

Stability increases with mass: while AlCl decomposes at 77 K or above, AlBr remains stable up to 253 K. Remarkably, it has been discovered that at any given temperature, the vapor pressure of AlF is orders of magnitude lower than that of other aluminium monohalides.

=== Disproportionation ===
At room temperature, AlX compounds tend to disproportionate to Al and AlX_{3}. When dark red, solid AlCl is allowed to warm up, it turns black to yield aluminium and the more stable aluminium (III) chloride salt.

2 AlCl (s) → Al (s) +AlCl_{3} (s)

Dohmier et al. documented that the exception is AlBr. AlBr is stable enough at temperatures under −30 °C that it comproportionates to AlBr_{2} in the presence of AlBr_{3}.

AlBr (s) + AlBr_{3} (s) → 2 AlBr_{2} (s)

=== Oligomerization ===
In Lewis basic solutions, AlX compounds have a tendency to oligomerize.

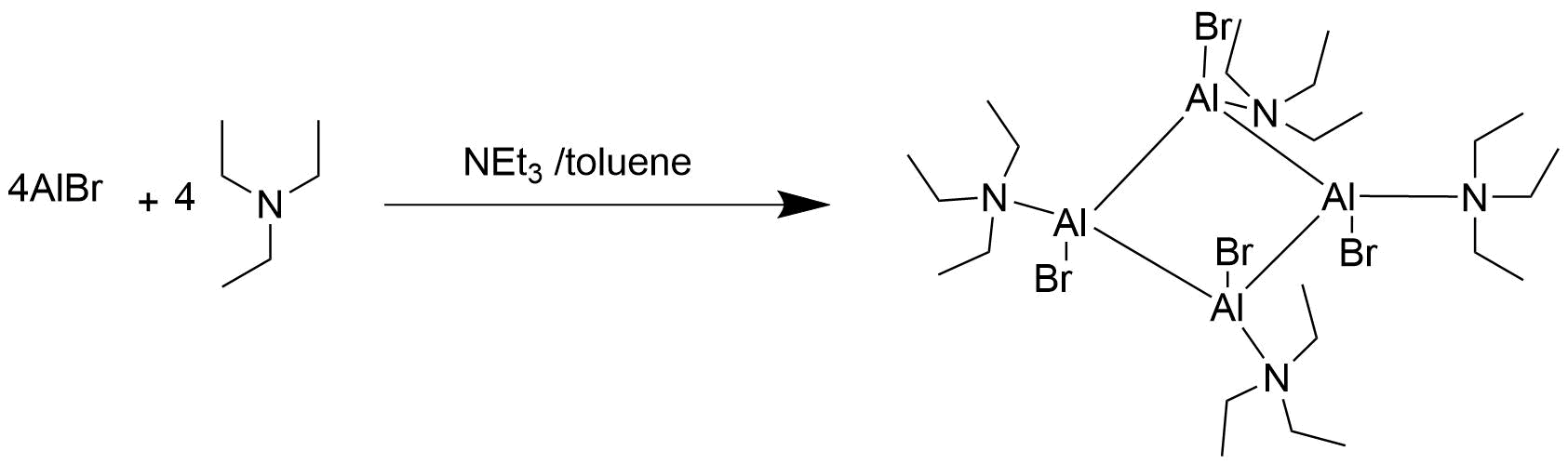
Molecular structure of the adduct of NEt_{3} with AlBr, [Al_{4}Br_{4}(NEt_{3})_{4})], in the solid state.

== Complex chemistry ==
Aluminium is not only the most abundant metal in the Earth's crust, but also an element of low toxicity. As such, aluminium (I) complexes attract considerable interest. These complexes can be supported by various ligands and used to activate small molecules.

=== β-Diketiminato systems ===
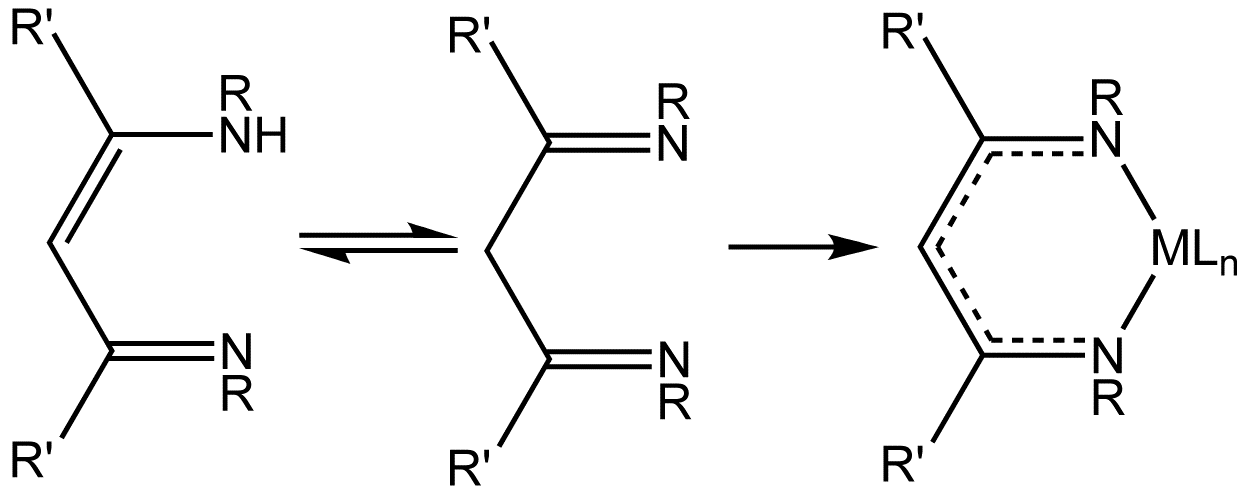
β-Diketiminato ligands, an example of a NacNac ligand. It is anionic and bidentate. Shown are tautomers of a substituted HNacNac ligand precursor, and an idealized complex (right) of the conjugate base (M = metal, L = other ligand)

In 2018, Liu et al. reviewed the chemistry of aluminium (I) with β-diketiminato ligands, widely used ligands with immense versatility in electronic and steric properties. These aluminium (I) complexes have immense potential for small molecule activation.

Synthesis

β-diketiminato aluminium alkyls and aluminium halides are synthesized by adding a trialkyl aluminium compound to the initial β-diketiminate ligands, adding iodine, and the reducing with potassium.

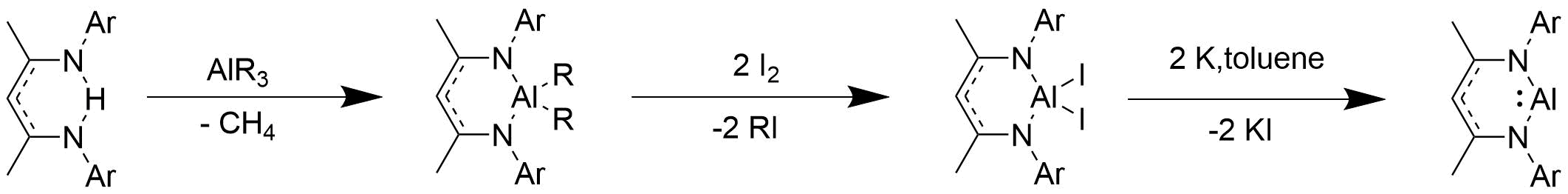
A synthetic route to aluminum (I) complexes supported by β-diketiminate ligands.

==== [1+2] Cycloadditions ====
Al(I) compounds exhibit behavior analogous to that of singlet carbenes. Like carbenes, they undergo [1+2] cycloadditions with alkynes and azides to afford three membered ring derivatives such as dialuminacyclohexadiene.

Similarly to the nucleophilic carbon center in the carbene, the lone pair on the aluminium center binds to the first azide equivalent. Nitrogen gas is liberated. With the second equivalent of azide, a five-member ring is formed.

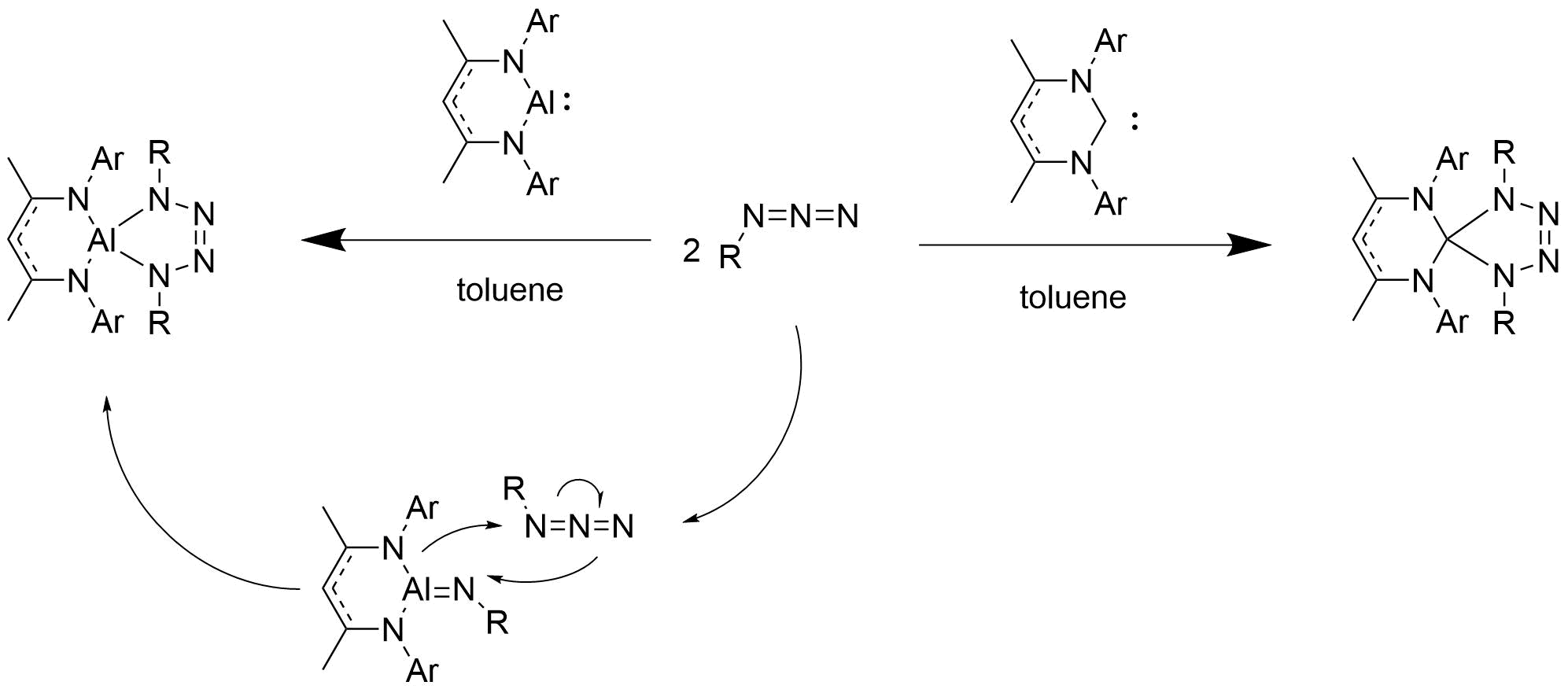
Aluminium (I) systems undergo reactions with azides in the same fashion as carbenes.

==== Reactions with other small molecules ====
Such aluminium (I) complexes can activate water as well as elemental phosphorus, oxygen, and sulfur to yield bridged dimers. This occurs via partial reduction of the elemental small molecule.

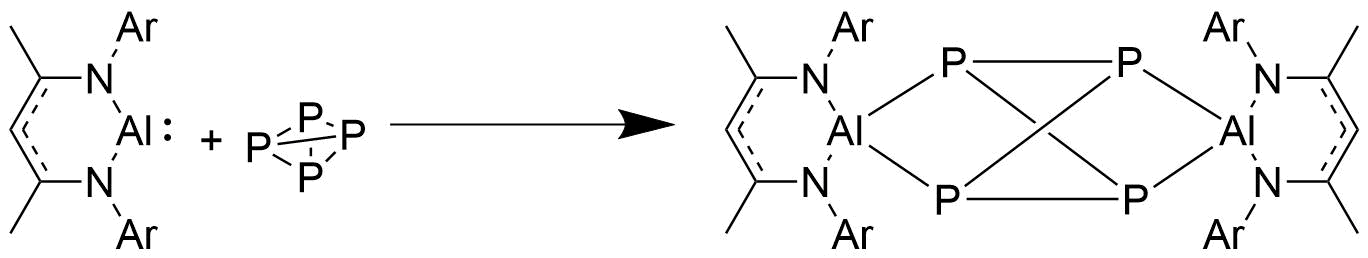
Activation of elemental phosphorus (P_{4}) by an aluminium (I) complex

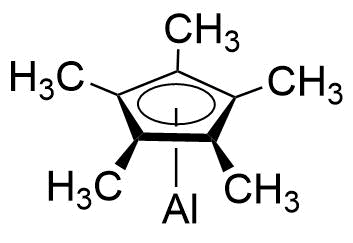
AlCp* ligand.

=== AlCp* ===
AlCp*, consisting of aluminium (I) bonded with the pentamethylcyclopentadiene anion ((CCH3)_{5}^{−}), was first synthesized in 1991 by Schnöckel et al. (AlCp*)_{4,} a yellow crystalline solid, is first produced from the combination of AlCl and MgCp*_{2.} When vaporized, the long Al-Al bonds (276.9 pm) split, and monomeric molecules of [AlCp*] are created.

As revealed through Schnöckel's work, [AlCp*] reacts by inserting itself into other bonds. Reaction with Al_{2}I_{6} yields subvalent halide species; reaction with As_{4}tBu_{4} yields As-Al bonds. When reacted with transition metal-cyclopentadienyl complexes such as NiCp_{2}, it offers a straightforward pathway to compounds containing aluminium-transition metal bonds, which has great potential for important catalytic reactions.

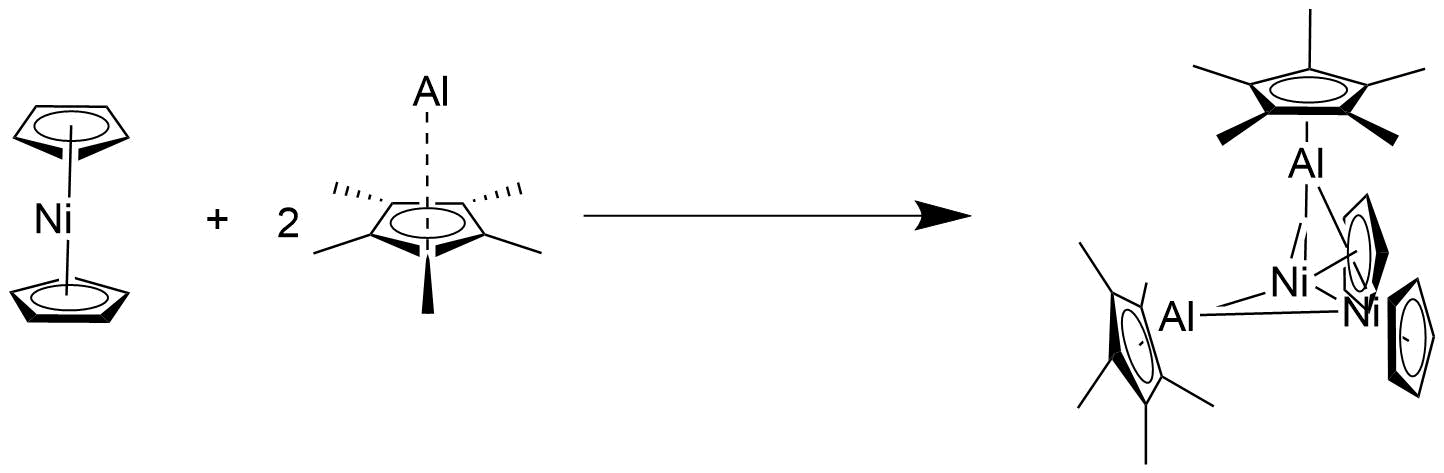
NiCp_{2} and AlCp* react to form a butterfly structure.

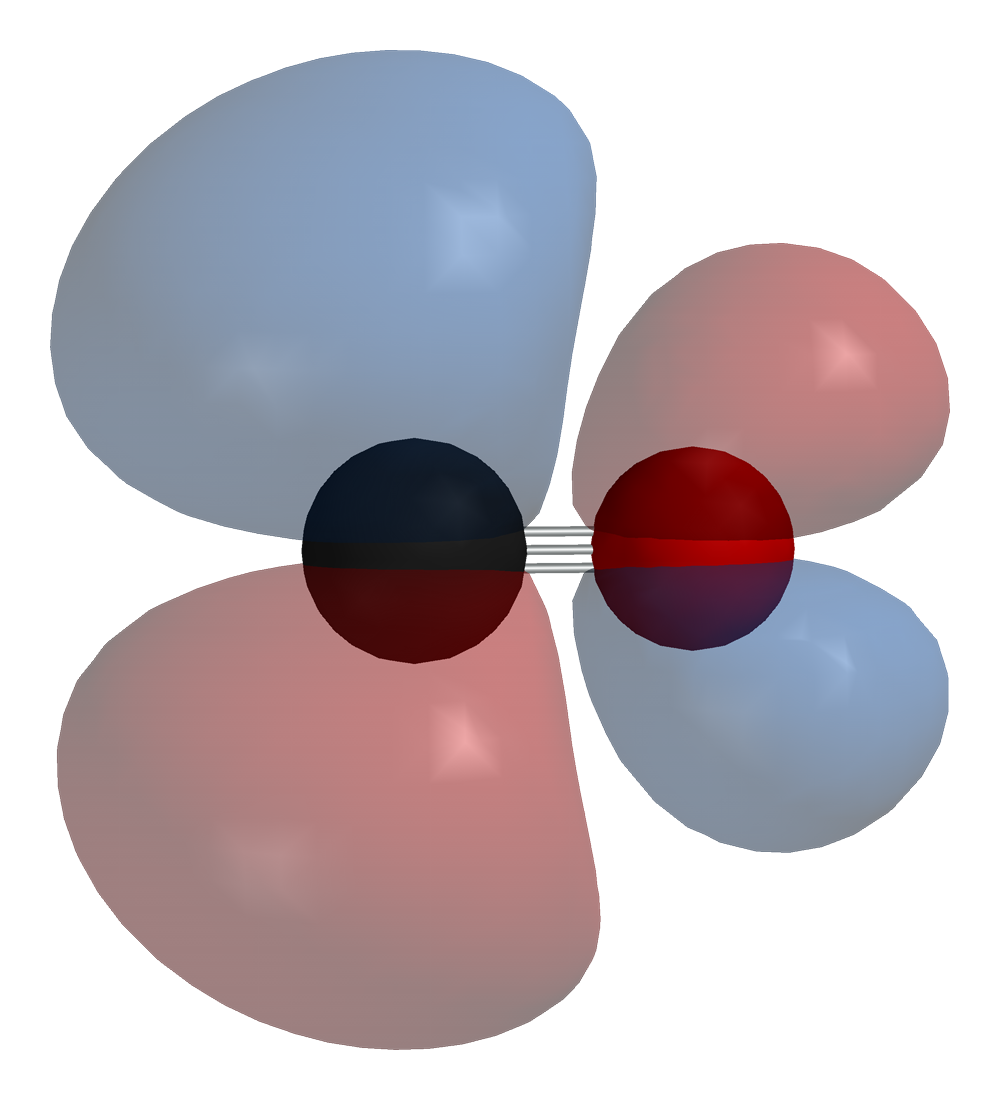
The LUMO orbitals of CO are shown here. These orbitals are antibonding π orbitals.

As with other AlR ligands, [AlCp*] can be regarded as a CO analogue, as it possesses 2 empty π orbitals and engages in similar coordination modes (terminal and bridging). This similarity implies the possibility of pi backbonding interactions between AlCp*and metals it complexes to.

== Metalloidal clusters ==
Work in aluminium clusters has been done by Linti and Schnockel. These metalloidal clusters can be formed from Al(I) compounds, namely aluminium monohalides. These clusters are termed "metalloidal clusters" because the number of unbridged metal-metal bonds is greater than the number of localized metal-ligand bonds. On the way to metal formation, intermediates are trapped in the presence of the bulky ligands which substitute the halide atoms. As a result, metal-rich clusters such as Al_{77}R_{20} are possible and offer insight into solid bulk metal formation.

Tetrahedral aluminium is available from the reaction between aluminium(I) species and organometallic species. These clusters can be made through combinations such as AlCp* and LiR, AlBr and Li(THF)_{3}(SiMe_{3})_{3,} and AlI and NaSiBu_{3}.

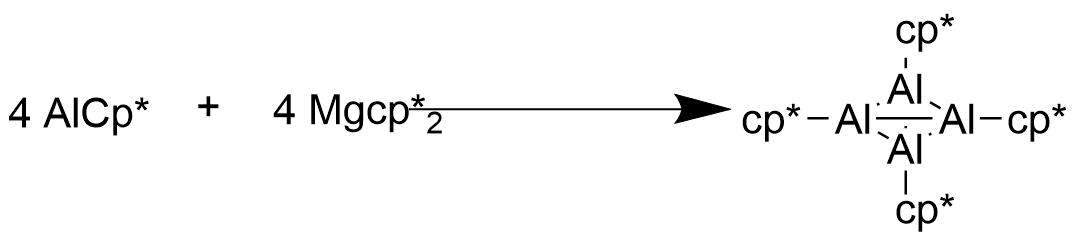
Formation of tetrahedral aluminium.

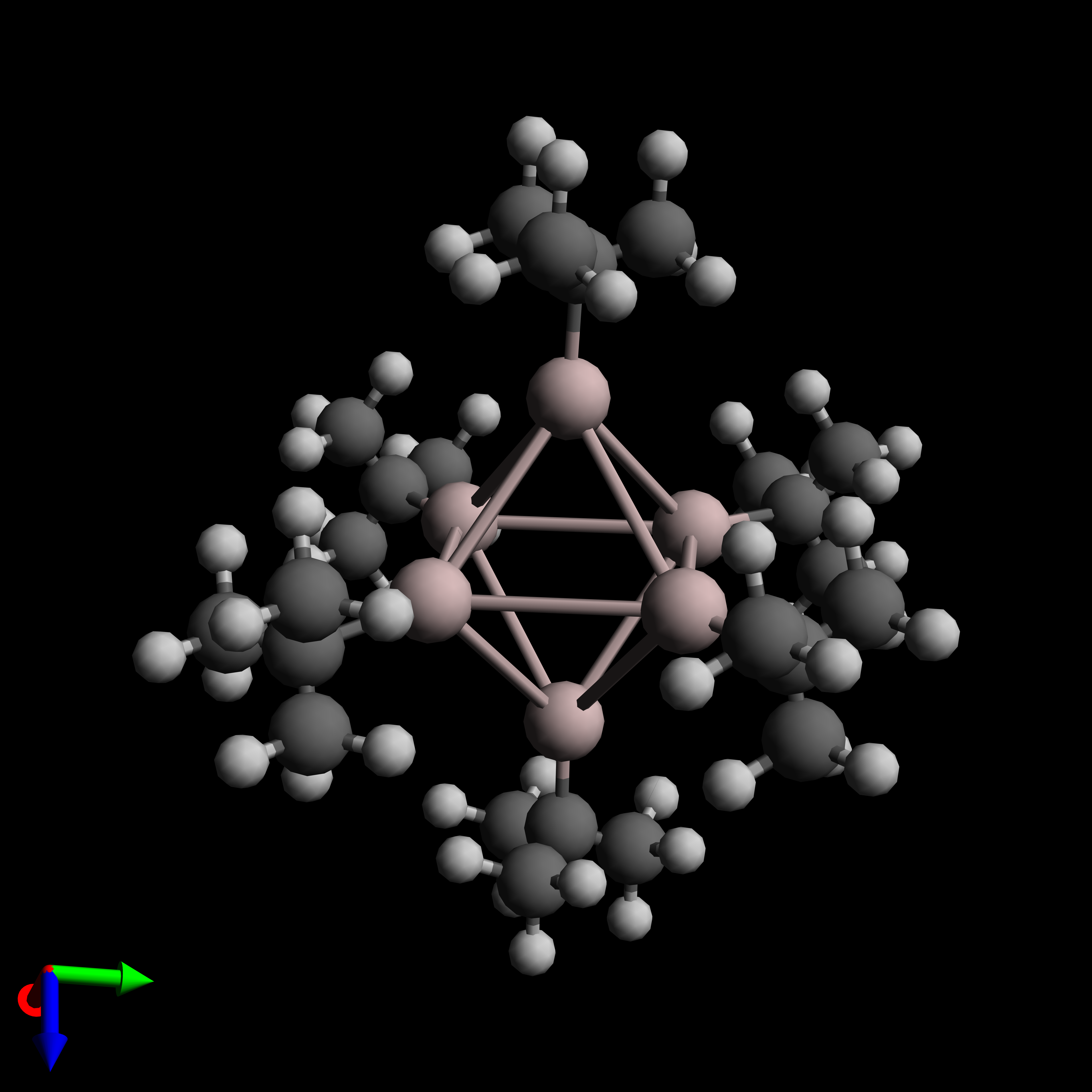
[Al_{6}(^{t}Bu)_{6}]^{•-} cluster, as synthesized by Linti et al. This is the first octahedral aluminium cluster synthesized.

This method of cluster formation created the only known incidence of an octahedral aluminium cluster, [Al_{6}(tBu)_{6}]^{−}, which was formed by reaction between AlCl and ^{t}BuLi. Similarly, AlCl and LiN(SiMe_{3})_{2} react to form the first known example of a cluster where two M_{4} tetrahedra are connected by a common center.

== Natural occurrence ==
Aluminium is rarely found in its +1 oxidation state in nature due to the immense stability of the +3 oxidation state.

Rotational transitions of AlF and AlCl have been detected in circumstellar shells near IRC +10216. The presence of AlF suggests that fluorine is produced in helium shell flashes instead of explosive nucleosynthesis.

== See also ==
- Aluminylene
