= Aluminylene =

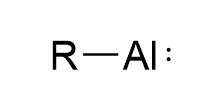
The general structure of an aluminylene compound.

Aluminylenes are a sub-class of aluminium(I) compounds that feature singly-coordinated aluminium atoms with a lone pair of electrons. As aluminylenes exhibit two unoccupied orbitals, they are not strictly aluminium analogues of carbenes until stabilized by a Lewis base to form aluminium(I) nucleophiles. The lone pair and two empty orbitals on the aluminium allow for ambiphilic bonding where the aluminylene can act as both an electrophile and a nucleophile. Aluminylenes have also been reported under the names alumylenes and alanediyl.

The +1 oxidation state for aluminium is less stable than heavier group 13 elements, but the lower stability and higher reactivity of aluminium(I) compounds make for interesting chemistry. The first aluminium(I) compound to be isolated was Dohmeier's (AlCp*)_{4} which existed as a tetrameric solid but dissociated in solution to the monomer. This was followed by Roesky's synthesis of a doubly coordinated aluminium(I) and nitrogen heterocycle analogous to an aluminium Arduengo carbene. Despite some rich aluminium(I) chemistry following those discoveries, it wasn't until 2020 that a free (not Lewis base stabilized) aluminylene was synthesized.

== Free aluminylenes ==
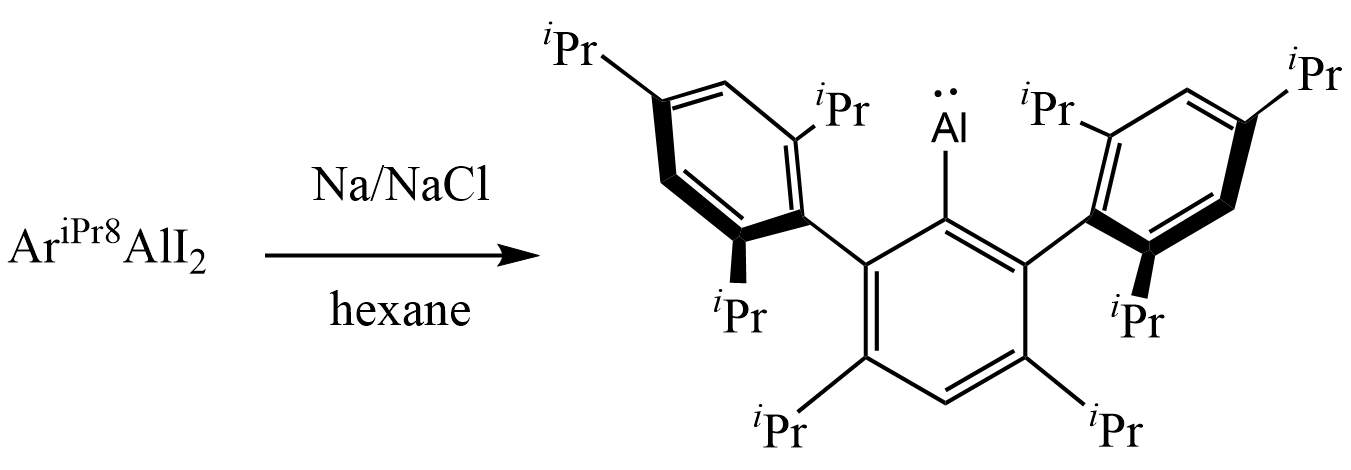
Synthetic method behind and structure of the terphenyl aluminylene synthesized by Power and coworkers.

Simple aluminylenes have been studied but are highly reactive and only exist in the gas phase under extreme conditions. The first free aluminylene came from Tuononen and Power, who used bulky terphenyl ligands to stabilize the reduction of the aluminium(III) diiodide. The isolated arylaluminylene formed thermally stable yellow-orange crystals that were characterized via X-ray crystallography and NMR spectroscopy. The aluminylene demonstrated more reactivity than its gallium analogue and quickly formed an aluminium hydride upon reaction with hydrogen gas.

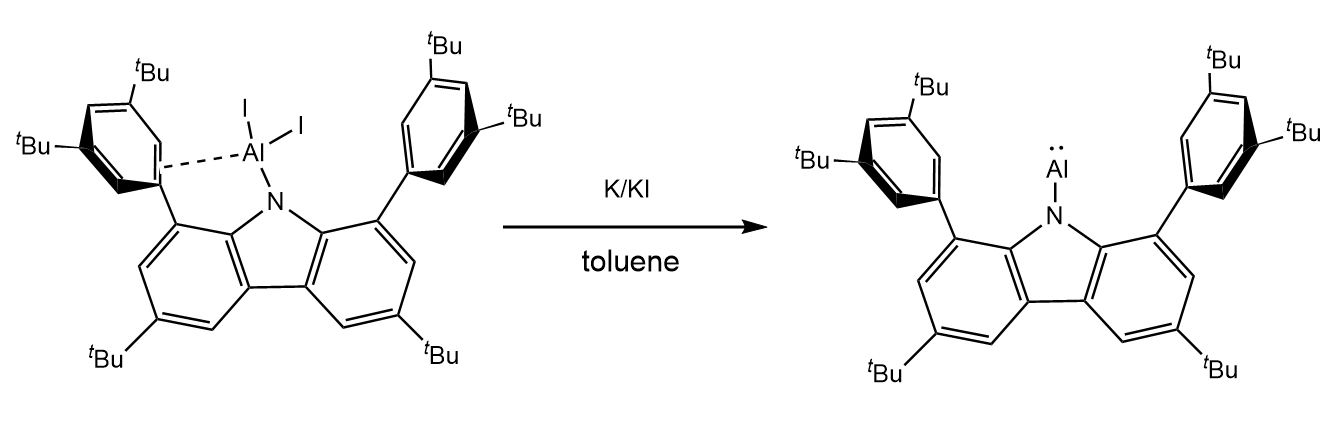
Synthetic scheme for the N-aluminylene.

Soon after, Liu and coworkers as well as Hinz and coworkers separately synthesized a free nitrogen bound aluminylenes that was stabilized with the use of bulky carbazolyl ligands. While also thermally stable, the N-aluminylene was extremely sensitive to air and water. Part of the stability of the N-aluminylene is based on slight pi-donation from the nitrogen atom, facilitated by the planar nature of the molecule. This conclusion is supported by electronic structure calculations and a slightly shorter N-Al bond distance than would be expected for a N-Al single bond. Both free aluminylenes largely depend on the steric bulk of their ligands for kinetic protection, a common motif in stabilizing reactive main group complexes.

== Reactivity ==
The ambiphilic nature of aluminylenes, as well as the reactivity of aluminium(I) complexes more generally, allows for aluminylenes to participate in a diverse range of reactions. Natural Bond Orbital (NBO) calculations showed that the frontier orbitals of these aluminylenes matched expectations with the aluminium lone pair as the HOMO and a largely aluminium p-orbital based LUMO.

=== Redox reactions ===
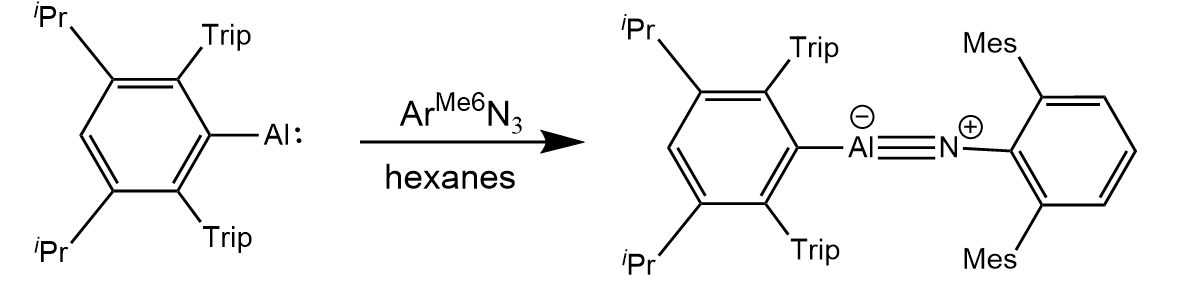
Synthesis of an Al-N triple bond compound from an aluminylene precursor.

Power's aluminylene was shown to react with organic azides to create aluminium(III) imides. In a reaction with Ar^{Me6}N_{3}, the terphenyl aluminylene was able to form an Al-N triple bond, a conclusion supported by the shortest reported Al-N bond distances (1.625Å). This aluminylene also reacted with less bulky azides, but the lack of steric protection meant that a second equivalent of azide reacted to give a multiply coordinated aluminium(III) compound.

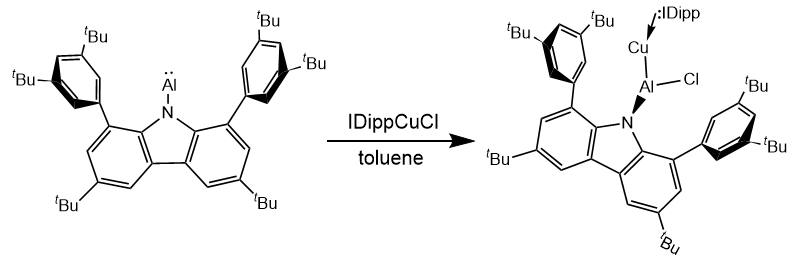
Synthetic scheme of the terminal copper alumanyl complex from the N-aluminylene.

The N-aluminylene reported by Liu and coworkers was shown to undergo an oxidative insertion reaction when mixed with IDippCuCl (IDipp=1,3-bis(2,6-diisopropylphenyl)imidazol-2-ylidene) to form a terminal copper-alumanyl complex.

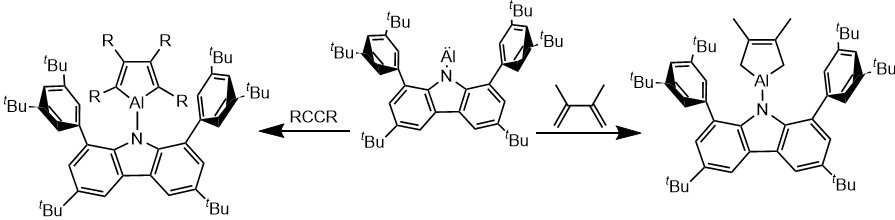
Example syntheses and structures of aluminium heterocycles from unsaturated hydrocarbons using the N-aluminylene.

Liu also demonstrated that the N-aluminylene could act as an important precursor to organoaluminium compounds. In these reactions, the aluminylene performs cycloaddition with unsaturated hydrocarbons to create aluminium heterocycles. Subsequently, the Al-N bond can be cleaved using a nucleophilic salt to free the newly formed organoaluminium compound.

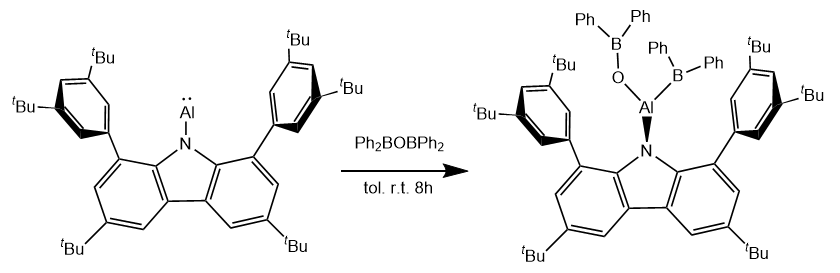
Synthetic scheme and structure of the N-aluminylene reacting with a boron lewis acid.

In 2023, Liu and coworkers published further examples of the reactivity of their N-aluminylene as they attempted to react the compound with various boron based Lewis acids. Upon reaction with Ph_{2}BOBPh_{2}, the aluminylene formed a tricoordinate species featuring new aluminium-boron and aluminium-oxygen bonds. This free alumaborane was characterized via ^{11}B NMR and showed two three-coordinate boron atoms, an observation further supported by x-ray crystallography data. The formation of Lewis adducts was also observed when the aluminylene was mixed with strong Lewis acids such as BCF (Tris(pentafluorophenyl)borane) and Piers' borane (HB(C_{6}F_{5})_{2}).

=== Lewis base stabilized aluminylenes ===
In addition to free aluminylenes, there have been several attempts to further stabilize these reactive species through the coordination of another Lewis base. Transient versions of these compounds have been reported on the way to other products via coordination with N-heterocyclic Carbenes (NHCs) and amidophosphines. However, in 2022 Liu and coworkers were able to form an adduct between their N-aluminylene and an NHC, a combination that demonstrated increased reactivity compared to the free aluminylene. They explained this with Density Functional Theory calculations at the M06-2X/def2-SVP level showing that the NHC coordination narrowed of the HOMO–LUMO gap by raising the energy of the aluminium lone pair (HOMO). This aluminylene-NHC adduct was then shown to activate otherwise unreactive arene species to initiate ring expansions.

=== Aluminylene coordination chemistry ===
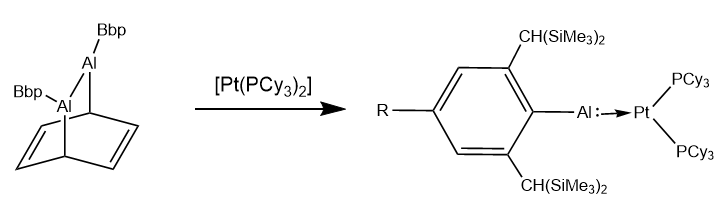
Synthetic scheme for one of Tokitoh's methods of forming aluminylene-platinum compounds.

Aluminylenes have also demonstrated the ability to act as ligands and coordinate to transition metal centers. Tokitoh demonstrated multiple methods for using dialumene starting materials to create an arylaluminylene platinum complexes. NBO calculations showed that the Al-Pt bond showed a large degree of electrostatic interaction, supplemented by sigma donation from the aluminium and pi-backbonding from the platinum.

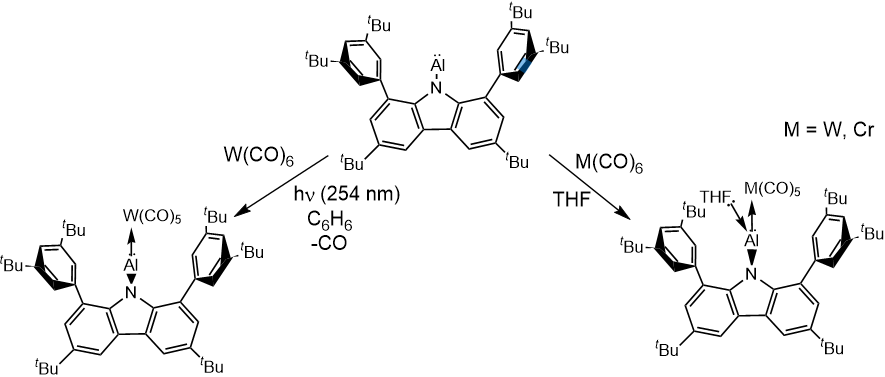
Synthetic scheme for transition metal complexes formed by coordination to an N-aluminylene.

The N-aluminylene reported by Liu, also demonstrated an ability to coordinate to metal atoms. UV irradiation of tungsten hexacarbonyl in the presence of the N-aluminylene created an aluminylene-W(CO)_{5} compound. Furthermore, treatment of the N-aluminylene with W(CO)_{6} and Cr(CO)_{6} in coordinating solvents such as THF and DMAP also formed the aluminylene-transition metal complexes. In these cases, the aluminylene was stabilized by having a THF molecule or two DMAP molecules donate their lone pairs into the aluminylenes empty orbitals. Intrinsic Bond Orbital calculations showed a significant degree of pi-backbonding from the aluminylene in the tungsten and chromium complexes, which added further stabilization.
