= Aluminium chloride (data page) =

Chemical data page

Supplementary data for aluminium chloride.

== External MSDS ==
- Baker
- Fisher
- EM Science
- Akzo Nobel (hexahydrate)
- Science Stuff (hexahydrate)
- External SDS

== Spectral data ==
UV-Vis
Spectrum
Lambda-max	nm
Log Ε
IR
Spectrum	NIST
Major absorption bands	cm^{−1}
NMR
Proton NMR	?
Carbon-13 NMR	?
Other NMR data	?
MS
Masses of main fragments	?

== Structure and properties data ==
Structure and properties
Index of refraction
Dielectric constant	C^{2}/(N·m^{2}) at 26 °C

This box:
- Except where noted otherwise, data relate to Standard temperature and pressure.
- Reliability of data general note.
