= Simon Aldridge =

British inorganic chemist

- Born: 26 July 1970 (age 56)
- Education: Jesus College, University of Oxford
- Scientific career
- Fields: Main group organometallic chemistry
- Workplaces: The Queen's College, University of Oxford
- Thesis: Studies of some volatile compounds of main group elements
- Doctoral advisor: Anthony Downs

Simon Aldridge FRS is a British chemist specialising in inorganic chemistry, with a particular focus on the chemistry of main group elements. He is currently a Professor of Chemistry at the University of Oxford and a Fellow and Tutor in Inorganic Chemistry at The Queen’s College, Oxford. His research has significantly contributed to the field of main group chemistry. Aldridge has been recognised with several awards, including a Fellowship of the Royal Society (FRS) in 2024.

== Early life and education ==
Aldridge was born in Shrewsbury, United Kingdom. He studied chemistry at Jesus College, University of Oxford, earning a Bachelor of Arts degree with first-class honours in 1992. He went on to complete a Doctor of Philosophy (DPhil) in Inorganic Chemistry at Oxford in 1996, under the supervision of A.J. Downs. His doctoral thesis focused on the chemistry of volatile compounds of main group elements.

== Academic career ==
Aldridge began his academic career as a Post-doctoral Associate at Imperial College London and the University of Notre Dame, USA, where he was also a Fulbright Scholar. In 1998, he joined Cardiff University as a Lecturer in the School of Chemistry, where he later became a Senior Lecturer and co-founded the Centre for Fundamental and Applied Main Group Chemistry.

In 2007, Aldridge returned to Oxford, where he was appointed as a University Lecturer (equivalent to Associate Professor) in Inorganic Chemistry. That same year, he became a Fellow and Tutor at The Queen’s College, Oxford. He was promoted to Professor of Main Group Chemistry in 2010.

Since 2019, Aldridge has been Director for the EPSRC Centre for Doctoral Training (CDT) in Inorganic Chemistry for Future Manufacturing (OxICFM). He is also Director of the EPSRC CDT in Inorganic Materials for Advanced Manufacturing (IMAT) (2024 - present), with both centres collectively managing research funding of over £25 million.

== Research and publications ==
Aldridge’s research interests span inorganic and organometallic chemistry, with a focus on the design of novel main group complexes for small molecule activation. He has published extensively, with over 265 peer-reviewed papers and an h-index of 60 (according to Google Scholar). His work has been featured in journals including Science, Nature Chemistry, and Angewandte Chemie.

Aldridge's most prominent works have involved the synthesis and reactivity of boryl- and aluminyl anions, in addition to acyclic silylenes and stannylenes.

In addition to his research articles, Aldridge co-authored a book on Group 13 elements titled The Group 13 Metals Aluminium, Gallium, Indium and Thallium: Chemical Patterns and Peculiarities, published by Wiley/Blackwell in 2010.

== Awards and honours ==
Aldridge has received several awards and fellowships in recognition of his contributions to chemistry, including the Royal Society of Chemistry’s Frankland Award in 2018 and Main Group Chemistry Award in 2010. He was presented with the Humboldt Prize by The Alexander von Humboldt Foundation in 2021. In 2024, Aldridge was elected as a Fellow of the Royal Society (FRS). He has also held visiting professorships at institutions such as the Technische Universität Berlin, Monash University, and Hong Kong Baptist University.
