= Dialumene =

Class of aluminium compounds

Dialumenes are a class of chemical compounds characterized by a double bond between two aluminium atoms (Al=Al). It belongs to the larger category of main-group alkene analogs that are traditionally considered difficult to synthesize but may elicit novel reactivity. Due to its relative electron deficiency, aluminium has a low tendency to form multiple bonds. It was not until 2017 that researchers were able to synthesize dialumenes, incorporating strong σ-donors such as N-heterocyclic carbenes (NHCs) to stabilize the bonding structure. Their weak π-bonding in comparison to their carbon counterparts potentially presents interesting reactivity towards small molecule activation and organometallic catalysis.

The research on dialumene is a cornerstone of low-valent main group chemistry, offering insights into the fundamental principles governing the chemistry of heavier elements. Main group elements are worse at forming multiple bonds than carbon because of the weaker orbital overlap. Unlike alkenes and alkynes, which typically form rigid planar or linear structures, main group compounds could offer diversified and distinct reactivity. The chemistry of dialumene is, however, largely unexplored, as the first stable dialumene compound was only synthesized in recent years, through a limited number of synthetic approaches. A few types of reactions have been attempted on dialumenes. They were shown to be able to undergo cycloaddition like unsaturated hydrocarbons. They could catalyze many chemical reactions by activating chemical bonds because of their unique electronic structure. Their capability of carrying out bond insertion on small molecules can create alternative solutions for some chemical transformations.

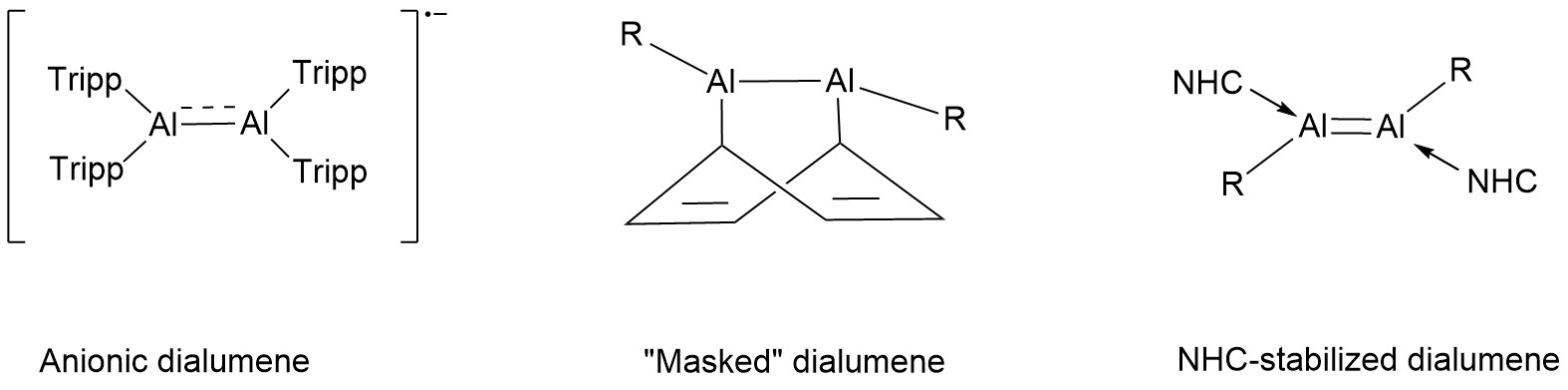
Three major types of dialumenes that have been experimentally synthesized

== Synthesis ==
The isolation of a dialumene compound requires both kinetic and electronic stabilization of the reactive double bond. Beginning in the 1990s, some synthetic effort of dialumene was made by Power et al., which mostly involved forming partial Al-Al π bond in anionic species through direct reduction of dialumanes. Spectroscopical evidence clearly revealed a shortened Al-Al bond. In 2013, a dialumene-benzene adduct, or "masked" dialumene, was synthesized by Tokitoh et al. and proven to be similar in reactivity with dialumene. The product turned out to be the result of cycloaddition between dialumene and the toluene solvent, after the researchers attempted to reduce Al-I bond with KC_{8}. But it was only until 2017 when Inoue et al. reported the first synthesis and isolation of stable, neutral dialumene compound. The Al=Al double bond was also formed by reducing Al-halogen bonds, but with thoughtful design of the coordination environment. An NHC ligand stabilizes the structure by electron donation, and a bulky silyl group protects the reactive aluminium center by steric hinderance. This synthetic methodology is the most effective by now, as the compound remains stable for weeks under room temperature and inert atmosphere.

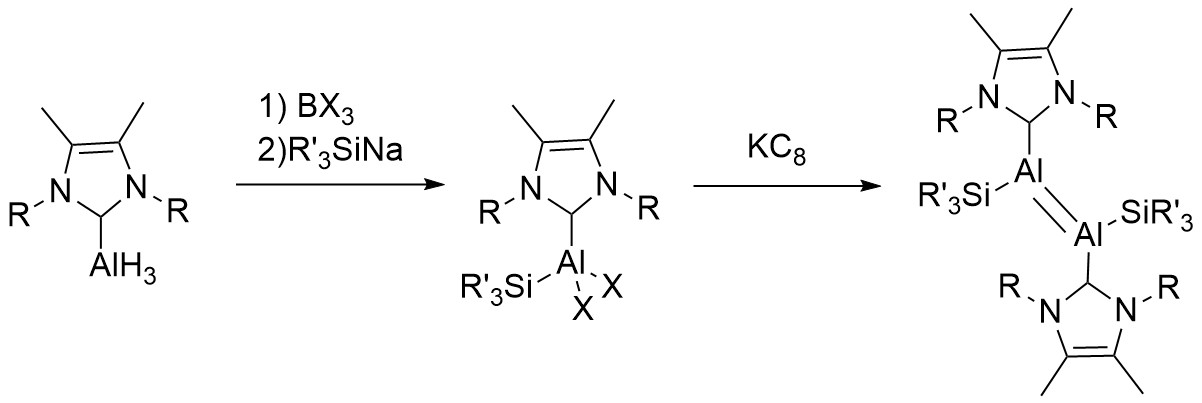
Synthetic route of dialumene using N-heterocyclic carbene and silyl ligand

=== Choice of ligand ===
The properties of a dialumene molecule relies strongly on the substituents. In a follow-up work, Inoue et al. replaced the silyl ligands with aryl ones and observed different reactivity and catalytic behavior. Although the participation of NHC or similar donors is still crucial for a stable dialumene compound, this allows researchers to modify their bonding characteristics and reactivity. It was shown that the steric demand of ligands could affect molecular geometry. The HOMO–LUMO gap is also lower in the aryl dialumene than the silyl dialumene (UV/Vis absorption at 833 nm compared to 573 nm). Further theoretical predictions suggest that substituting the silyl group with more electron withdrawing ligands could elevate the activity of metal center, at the cost of synthetic ease.

== Bonding ==
Before the synthesis of a stable dialumene sample, computational models predict strong diradical character in the bonding of dialumene. This is supported by the 2.39 Å bond length from crystallographic data of synthesized dialumene. The strength of the weakened π bond is influenced by the electronic effects of substituents on aluminium.

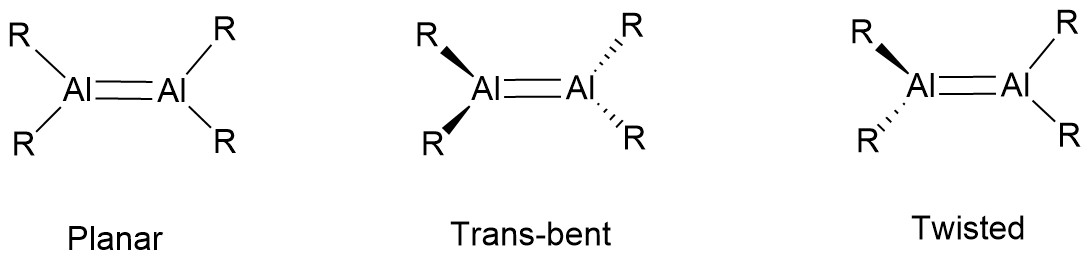
Planar, trans-bent, and twisted geometry of dialumene

Unlike alkenes, dialumenes do not necessarily adopt a planar structure. The weak Al-Al bond is prone to distortion when electron deficient orbitals on Al interact with ligands. This offers dialumene unconventional reactivity among multiple bond species. It is observed that due to steric demands, aryl-substituted dialumene is trans-bent while the silyl-substituted one is trans-planar. When the molecule is planar near the Al=Al double bond, the π-bond is formed by almost pure Al p-orbitals. The Wiberg bond index (WBI) of the silyl dialumene is 1.70, as opposed to 1.53 for the aryl dialumene. Weakened π-bond behaves more like a diradical and participates more readily in reactions. This resonates with experimental observations that the non-planar geometry typically provides more flexibility and could react with more sterically demanding substrates. In fact, many of the fascinating reactions below are found with the aryl-substituted dialumene.

== Reactivity ==
=== Cycloaddition ===
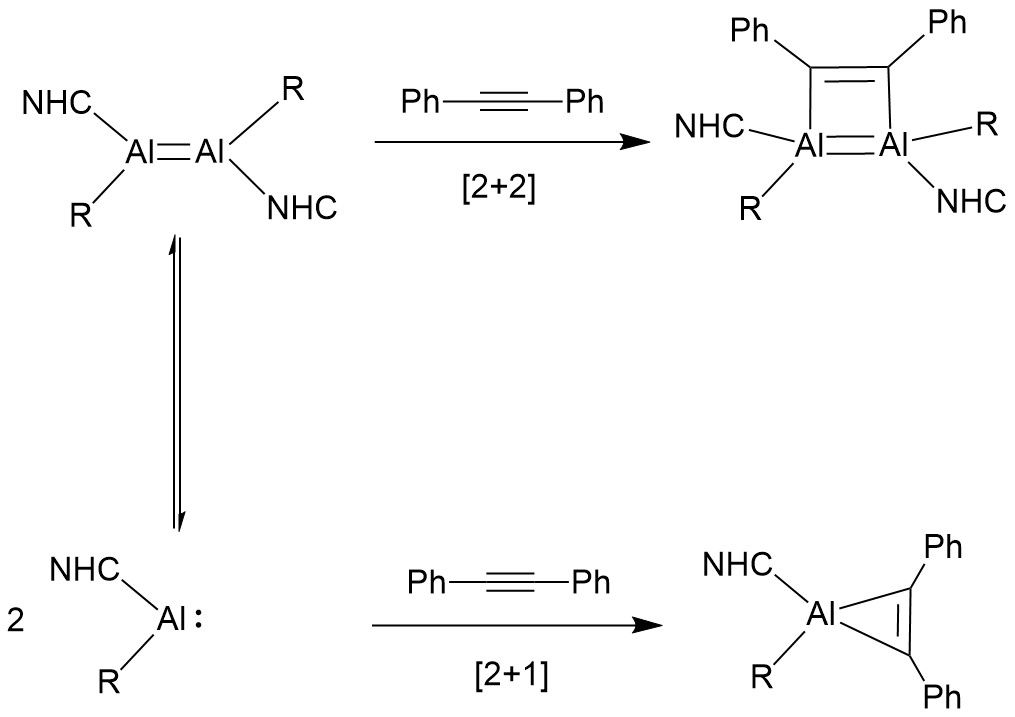
Dialumene may undergo [2+2] or [2+1] cycloaddition reaction

The low HOMO/LUMO gap renders dialumene good reactivity in forming organoaluminium compounds. Dialumenes react readily at room temperature with alkenes and alkynes through [2+2] cycloaddition. It was shown that substituents could affect the rate of such reaction, but their role is not determining. The "masked" dialumene synthesized by Tokitoh et al. results from Diels-Alder type reaction with aromatic solvents such as toluene. The reaction is reversible just as normal Diels-Alder reaction, and the product possesses similar reactivity as dialumene. In many cases, the transient nature of dialumenes is crucial. Dialumenes with weak Al=Al bonds can readily dissociate in solution into highly reactive monomeric Al(I) fragments called aluminylenes. This aluminylene can then undergo a [2+1] cycloaddition with alkynes, forming three-membered aluminacyclopropenes. The choice of reaction pathway is mostly dictated by the stability of the dialumene, or the strength of the Al=Al double bond. A stronger bond, which usually sits in a trans-planar molecule, favors [2+2] cycloaddition. A trans-bent dialumene, on the other hand, is more prone to dissociation and may undergo [2+1] cycloaddition.

=== Bond activation ===
The high Lewis acidity of dialumene could induce exotic reactivity with many chemical bonds. 1,2-hydrogenation of dialumene is executed by donation of hydrogen σ orbital to aluminium, and the back-donation of lone pair on the other aluminium into hydrogen antibonding orbital, through a concerted mechanism. This can imply potential usage in hydrogen conversion and storage. In-depth theoretical studies have been performed on this topic, suggesting that electron withdrawing group in the molecule lowers the energy of transition state. The conclusion is consistent with experimental fact that hydrogenation occurs on aryl- but not silyl-substituted dialumenes. Masked dialumene proceeds through H-H bond activation in a different way, forming a dimer of dihydroalumane (RAlH_{2}) with bridging H atoms.

The ability of dialumenes to activate chemical bonds is close to transitional metal complexes, which can be illustrated by cleavage of C-F bonds through oxidative addition. The unique orbital energetics of dialumenes allow for interaction with these rigid bonds, a rarely seen feature among main-group elements. This process is highly selective for carbon-halogen bonds. The resulting Al-Al single bond is fragile and may undergo reductive elimination. The products are a transient alumylene species and an Al center that's inserted into the above C-F bond. The latter one can be functionalized through further treatment and can be synthetically applicable.

=== Reversible dissociation ===
Despite being nominally a double bond, the Al-Al bonding in dialumene could dissociate under certain circumstances. Cowley et al. found that the bond in an amidophosphine-supported dialumene is weak enough to break in solution, forming two aluminylene monomers with low valence aluminium. DFT calculations indicate a large singlet/triplet energy difference caused by electron donation from ligands gives rise to low Al-Al bond order. Especially, dialumenes with weak ligand-metal π interaction more easily dissociates, partly due to stronger Pauli repulsion from electrons on Al as well as higher structural distortion. The discovery is significant in that the dimer and the monomer can undergo cycloaddition through different pathways, and certain dialumene species with especially weak Al=Al bond may generate two products (from [2+2] and [2+1] cycloaddition) when reacting with alkynes.

=== Reaction with small molecules ===
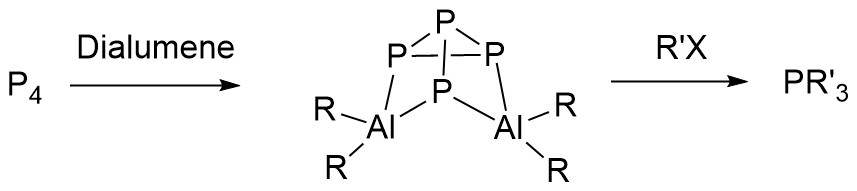
Making phosphine from white phosphorus with dialumene

Besides engaging in bond activation such as breaking H_{2} molecules, dialumene also presents novel reactivity with other small, simple molecules. The low valence of dialumene, coupled with aluminium's tendency to form single bonds, makes dialumene especially reactive with small, unsaturated molecules. This is exemplified by the two-electron reduction of white phosphorus with dialumene, which forms a butterfly-like structure as the P_{4} molecule inserts into Al=Al bond. The dialumene structure motif may undergo a cis-to-trans conversion in this reaction. With further workup, white phosphorus can be converted into P^{3-}. This approach circumvents the high temperature and pressure conditions common in industrial production of phosphines, allowing for energy conservation.

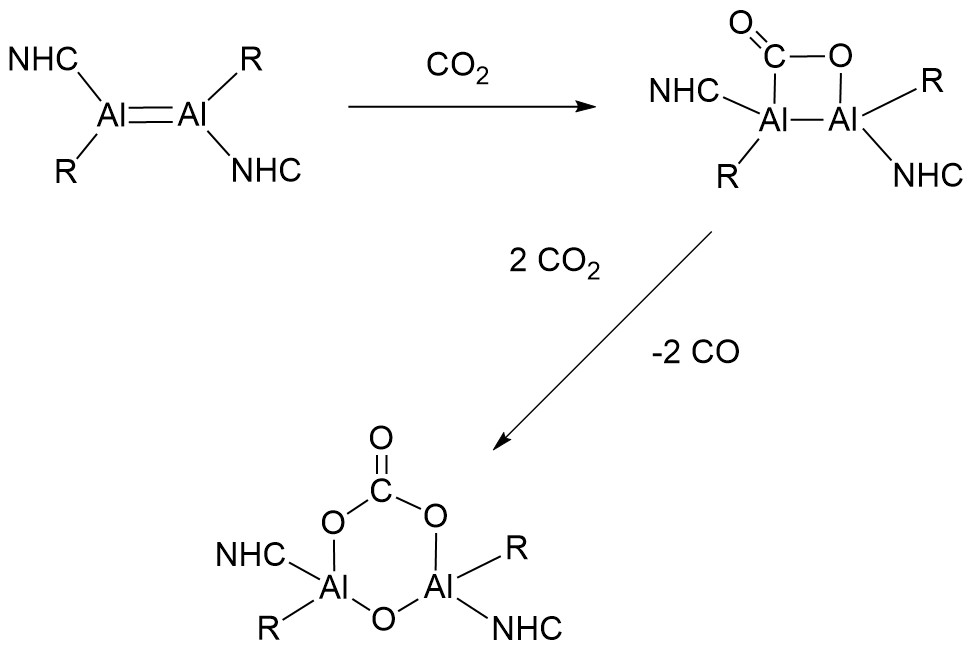
Reaction of dialumene with carbon dioxide

Dialumene is also able to stoichiometrically react with C=O double bond in CO_{2} at low temperatures, first through a formal [2+2] cycloaddition. The four-membered ring further reacts with CO_{2}, resulting in a bridging carbonate group between the aluminium atoms along with the release of CO. This reaction can be leveraged for the catalytic reduction of CO_{2} to a formic acid equivalent. A variety of other reactions are observed when mixing dialumene with common inorganic molecules. Amino borane, a competitive candidate for hydrogen storage, can interact with catalytic amounts of dialumene to achieve an elevated rate of dehydrogenation via σ-bond metathesis. In addition, dialumene can be oxidized by O_{2} or N_{2}O to form oxo-bridged species.
