= Gallium monofluoride =

Names
- IUPAC name fluorogallium
- Other names gallium(I) fluoride

Identifiers
CAS Number	13966-78-4
3D model (JSmol)	Interactive image
ChemSpider	4909102
PubChem CID	6395321
- InChI: InChI=1S/FH.Ga/h1H;/q;+1/p-1 Key: CXPXVVXGLWMDKK-UHFFFAOYSA-M
- SMILES: F[Ga]

Properties
Chemical formula	FGa
Molar mass	88.721 g/mol
Appearance	Gaseous
- Except where otherwise noted, data are given for materials in their standard state (at 25 °C [77 °F], 100 kPa). Infobox references

Gallium monofluoride is an inorganic compound with the formula GaF. The compound has only been observed in the gas-phase.

It can be generated by the oxidation of gallium with either aluminum fluoride or calcium fluoride.

== Research ==
In 2011, a group of Brazilian and German researchers used the molecular absorption of fluorogallium created in a graphite furnace to determine that 5.2 picograms of fluorine is the smallest detectable portion of the element.

Its ionization energy is 10.64 eV.
