= Aluminium monochloride =

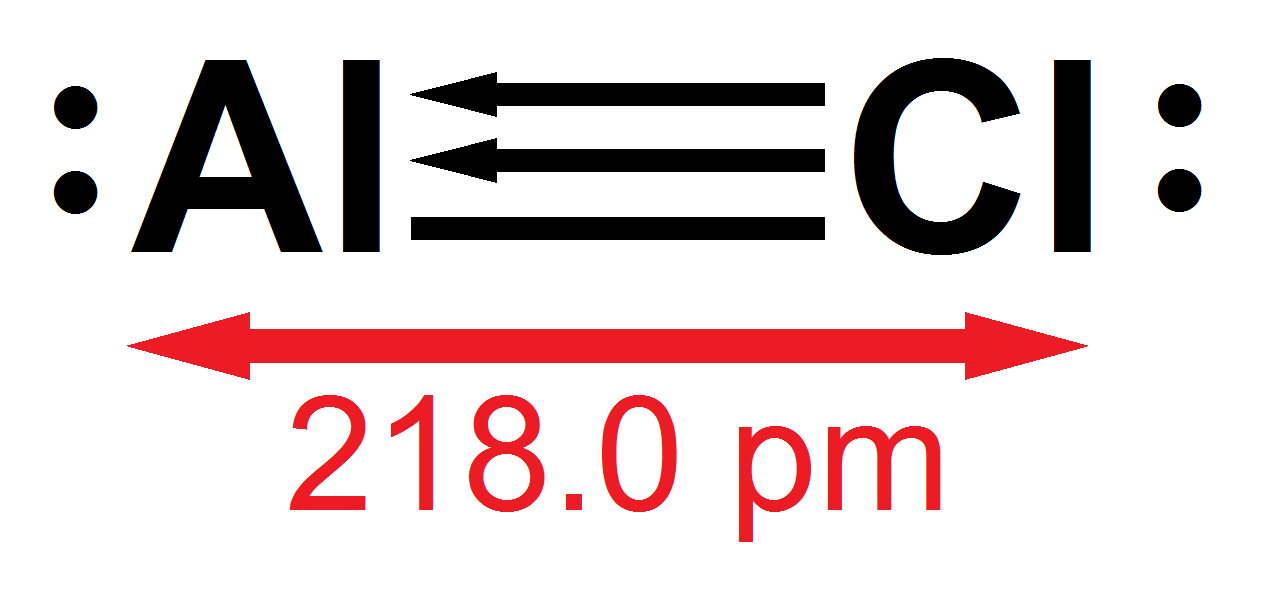

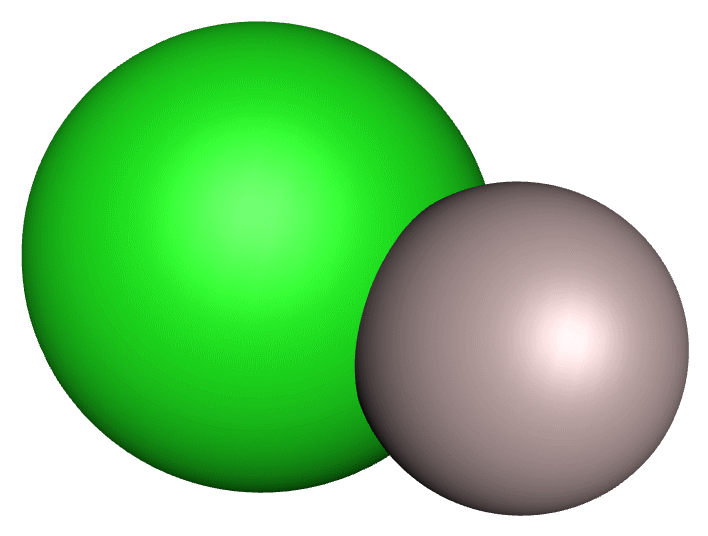

Names
- IUPAC name Chloridoaluminium
- Other names Aluminium(I) chloride

Identifiers
CAS Number	13595-81-8
3D model (JSmol)	Interactive image
ChEBI	CHEBI:30131
ChemSpider	4514257
PubChem CID	5359282
CompTox Dashboard (EPA)	DTXSID40159602
- InChI: InChI=1S/Al.ClH/h;1H/q+1;/p-1 Key: IZMHKHHRLNWLMK-UHFFFAOYSA-M
- SMILES: [Al]Cl

Properties
Chemical formula	AlCl
Molar mass	62.43 g·mol^{−1}

Thermochemistry
Std molar entropy (S^{⦵}_{298})	227.95 J K^{−1} mol^{−1}
Std enthalpy of formation (Δ_{f}H^{⦵}_{298})	−51.46 kJ mol^{−1}

Related compounds
Related compounds	aluminium monofluoride gallium monofluoride
- Except where otherwise noted, data are given for materials in their standard state (at 25 °C [77 °F], 100 kPa). verify (what is ?) Infobox references

Aluminium monochloride, or chloridoaluminium is the metal halide with the formula AlCl. Aluminium monochloride as a molecule is thermodynamically stable at high temperature and low pressure only. This compound is produced as a step in the Alcan process to smelt aluminium from an aluminium-rich alloy.

== Alcan process ==
When an aluminium alloy is placed in a reactor that is heated to 1,300 °C and mixed with aluminium trichloride, a gas of aluminium monochloride is produced.

2 Al(alloy) + AlCl_{3}(gas) → 3 AlCl(gas)

It then disproportionates into aluminium melt and aluminium trichloride upon cooling to 900 °C.

The process is an instance of the general sub-halide catalytic distillation method (subhalide process) developed by Philipp Gross. It was sold to Alcan but never put into full-scale production.

== Interstellar medium ==
This molecule has been detected in the interstellar medium, where molecules are so dilute that intermolecular collisions are unimportant.

== See also ==
- Aluminium monofluoride
- Aluminium monobromide
- Aluminium monoiodide
