= Aluminium bromide =

Chemical compound

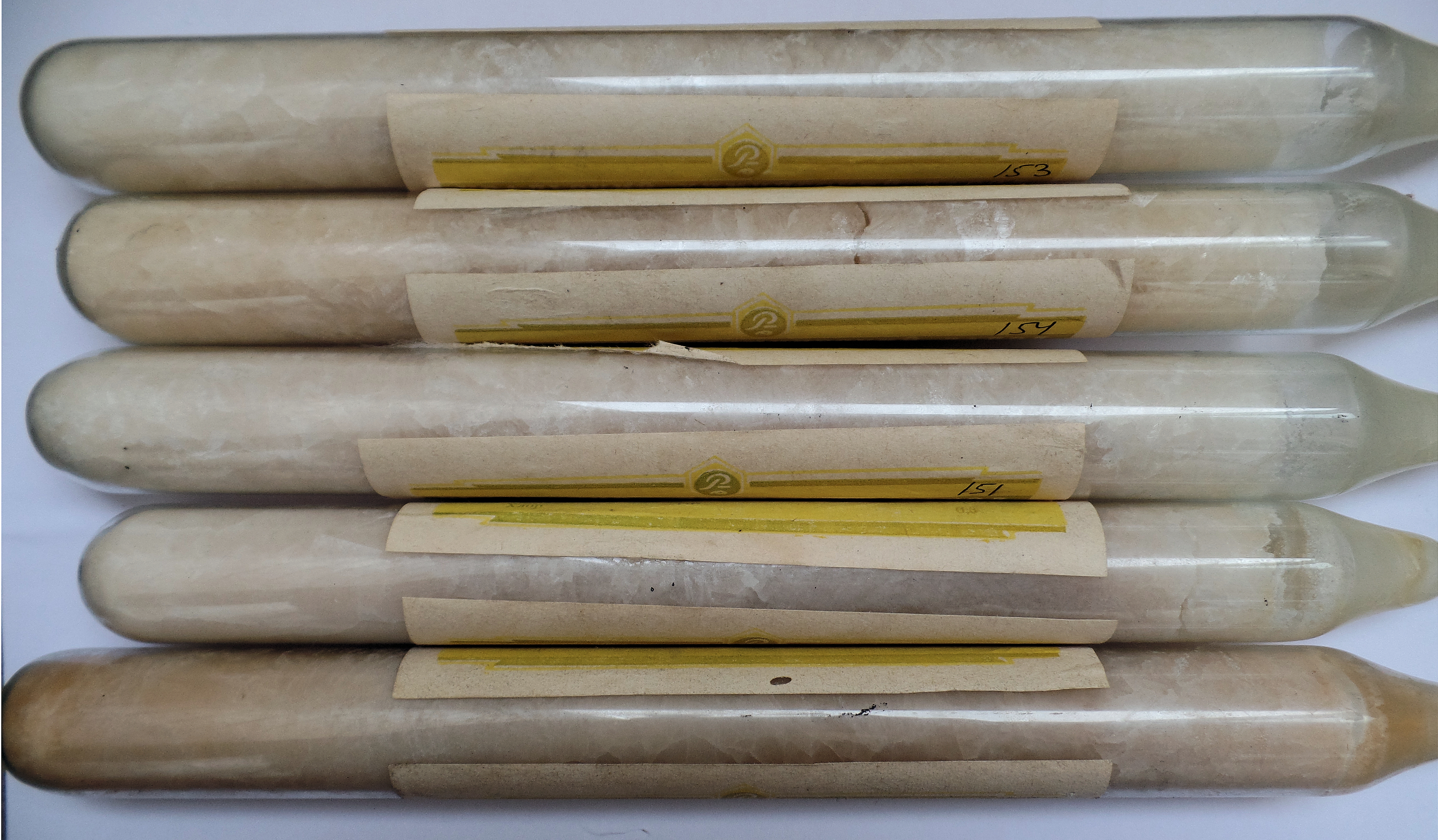
- Aluminium bromide from 1967 In large ampoules

- Skeletal formula of aluminium bromide

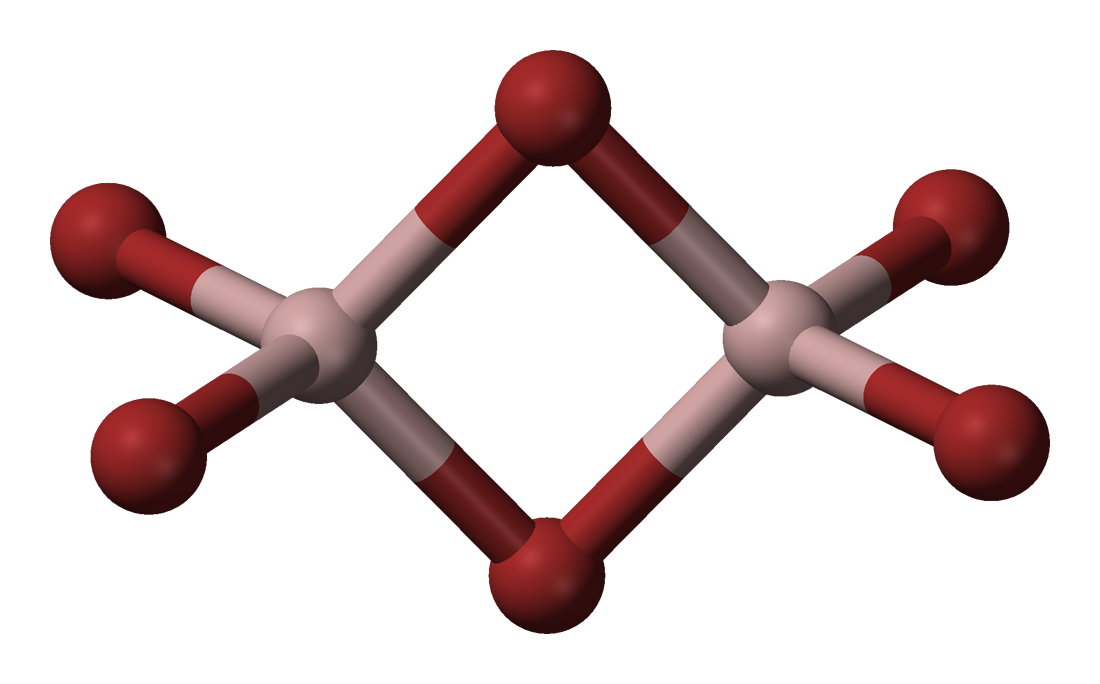
Ball and stick model of dimeric aluminium bromide
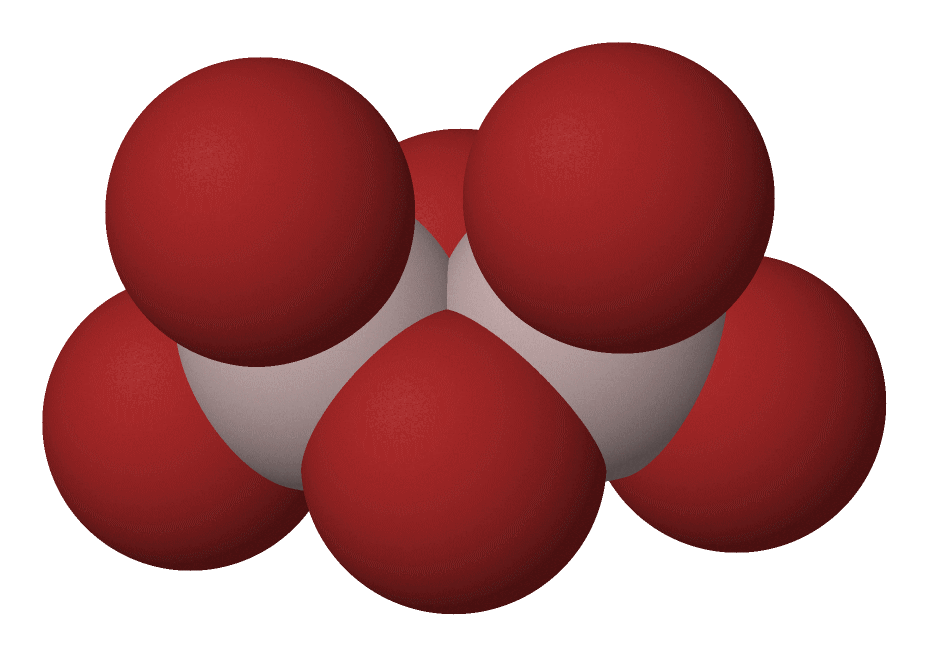

Names
- Preferred IUPAC name Aluminium bromide
- Other names: Aluminic bromide; Aluminium(III) bromide; Aluminium tribromide

Identifiers
CAS Number	7727-15-3; 7784-11-4 hexahydrate
3D model (JSmol)	monomer: Interactive image; dimer: Interactive image; hexahydrate: Interactive image
ChemSpider	22818; 9040513 hemi(acetyl bromide); 9499890 ethanethiol
ECHA InfoCard	100.028.891
EC Number	231-779-7
PubChem CID	24409; 11062022 tertikis(tetrachloromethane); 10865226 hemi(acetyl bromide); 11324936 ethanethiol; 6093832 tris(pyridine)
RTECS number	BD0350000
UNII	IY20HBK5LK
UN number	1725
CompTox Dashboard (EPA)	DTXSID2064783
- InChI: InChI=1S/Al.3BrH/h;3*1H/q+3;;;/p-3 Key: PQLAYKMGZDUDLQ-UHFFFAOYSA-K; InChI=1/Al.3BrH/h;3*1H/q+3;;;/p-3 Key: PQLAYKMGZDUDLQ-DFZHHIFOAT
- SMILES: monomer: Br[Al](Br)Br; dimer: Br[Al-]1(Br)[Br+][Al-]([Br+]1)(Br)Br; hexahydrate: [OH2+][Al-3]([OH2+])([OH2+])([OH2+])([OH2+])[OH2+].[Br-].[Br-].[Br-]

Properties
Chemical formula	AlBr_{3} Al_{2}Br_{6} AlBr_{3}·6H_{2}O (hexahydrate)
Molar mass	266.694 g/mol (anhydrous); 374.785 g/mol (hexahydrate)
Appearance	white to pale yellow powder
Odor	pungent
Density	3.2 g/cm^{3} (anhydrous); 2.54 g/cm^{3} (hexahydrate)
Melting point	97.5 °C (anhydrous); 93 °C (hexahydrate)
Boiling point	255 °C (anhydrous)
Solubility in water	very soluble, partially hydrolyses indicated by a fuming solution and an optional appearance of white precipitate
Solubility	slightly soluble in methanol, diethyl ether, acetone

Structure
Crystal structure	Monoclinic, mP16 (anhydrous)
Space group	P2_{1}/c, No. 14
Lattice constant	a = 0.7512 nm, b = 0.7091 nm, c = 1.0289 nm α = 90°, β = 96.44°, γ = 90°
Formula units (Z)	4

Thermochemistry
Heat capacity (C)	100.6 J/(mol·K)
Std molar entropy (S^{⦵}_{298})	180.2 J/(mol·K)
Std enthalpy of formation (Δ_{f}H^{⦵}_{298})	−572.5 kJ/mol

Hazards
- GHS labelling
Pictograms	(GHS05: Corrosive) (GHS07: Exclamation mark)
Signal word	Danger
Hazard statements	H302, H314
Precautionary statements	P260, P264, P270, P280, P301+P312, P301+P330+P331, P303+P361+P353, P304+P340, P305+P351+P338, P310, P321, P330, P363, P405, P501
NFPA 704 (fire diamond)	3 1 1
- Lethal dose or concentration (LD, LC)
LD_{50} (median dose)	1598 mg/kg (oral, rat)

Related compounds
Other anions	aluminium trichloride aluminium triiodide
Other cations	boron tribromide
Related compounds	iron(III) bromide
- Except where otherwise noted, data are given for materials in their standard state (at 25 °C [77 °F], 100 kPa). verify (what is ?) Infobox references

Aluminium bromide is any chemical compound with the empirical formula AlBr_{x}. Aluminium tribromide is the most common form of aluminium bromide. It is a colorless, sublimable hygroscopic solid; hence old samples tend to be hydrated, mostly as aluminium tribromide hexahydrate (AlBr_{3}·6H_{2}O).

== Structure ==
The dimeric form of aluminium tribromide (Al_{2}Br_{6}) predominates in the solid state, in solutions in noncoordinating solvents (e.g. CS_{2}), in the melt, and in the gas phase. Only at high temperatures do these dimers break up into monomers:

Al_{2}Br_{6} ⇌ 2 AlBr_{3} Δ_{diss}H^{⦵} = 59 kJ/mol

The species aluminium monobromide forms from the reaction of HBr with Al metal at high temperature. It disproportionates near room temperature:

6/n "[AlBr]_{n}" ⇌ Al_{2}Br_{6} + 4 Al

This reaction is reversed at temperatures higher than 1000 °C. Aluminium monobromide has been crystallographically characterized in the form the tetrameric adduct Al_{4}Br_{4}(NEt_{3})_{4} (Et = −C_{2}H_{5}). This species is electronically related to cyclobutane. Theory suggests that the diatomic aluminium monobromide condenses to a dimer and then a tetrahedral cluster Al_{4}Br_{4}, akin to the analogous boron compound.

Al_{2}Br_{6} consists of two AlBr_{4} tetrahedra that share a common edge. The molecular symmetry is D_{2h}.

The monomer AlBr_{3}, observed only in the vapor, can be described as trigonal planar, D_{3h} point group. The atomic hybridization of aluminium is often described as sp^{2}. The Br-Al-Br bond angles are 120°.

== Synthesis ==
Experiment showing synthesis of aluminium bromide from the elements.

By far the most common form of aluminium bromide is Al_{2}Br_{6}. This species exists as hygroscopic colorless solid at standard conditions. Typical impure samples are yellowish or even red-brown due to the presence of iron-containing impurities. It is prepared by the reaction of HBr with Al:

2 Al + 6 HBr → Al_{2}Br_{6} + 3 H_{2}

Alternatively, the direct bromination occurs also:

2 Al + 3 Br_{2} → Al_{2}Br_{6}

== Reactions ==
A demonstration of the reaction of the exothermic reaction of the strong Lewis acid (Al_{2}Br_{6}) and weak Lewis base (H_{2}O).

Al_{2}Br_{6} dissociates readily to give the strong Lewis acid, AlBr_{3}. Regarding the tendency of Al_{2}Br_{6} to dimerize, it is common for heavier main group halides to exist as aggregates larger than implied by their empirical formulae. Lighter main group halides such as boron tribromide do not show this tendency, in part due to the smaller size of the central atom.

Consistent with its Lewis acidic character, Al_{2}Br_{6} is hydrolyzed by water with evolution of HBr and formation of Al-OH-Br species. Similarly, it also reacts quickly with alcohols and carboxylic acids, although less vigorously than with water. With simple Lewis bases (L), Al_{2}Br_{6} forms adducts, such as AlBr_{3}L.

Aluminium tribromide reacts with carbon tetrachloride at 100 °C to form carbon tetrabromide:

4 AlBr_{3} + 3 CCl_{4} → 4 AlCl_{3} + 3 CBr_{4}

and with phosgene yields carbonyl bromide and aluminium chlorobromide:

AlBr_{3} + COCl_{2} → COBr_{2} + AlCl_{2}Br

Al_{2}Br_{6} is used as a catalyst for the Friedel-Crafts alkylation reaction. Related Lewis acid-promoted reactions include as epoxide ring openings and decomplexation of dienes from iron carbonyls. It is a stronger Lewis acid than the more common Al_{2}Cl_{6}.

== Safety ==
Aluminium tribromide is a highly reactive material.
