= Aluminium monoiodide =

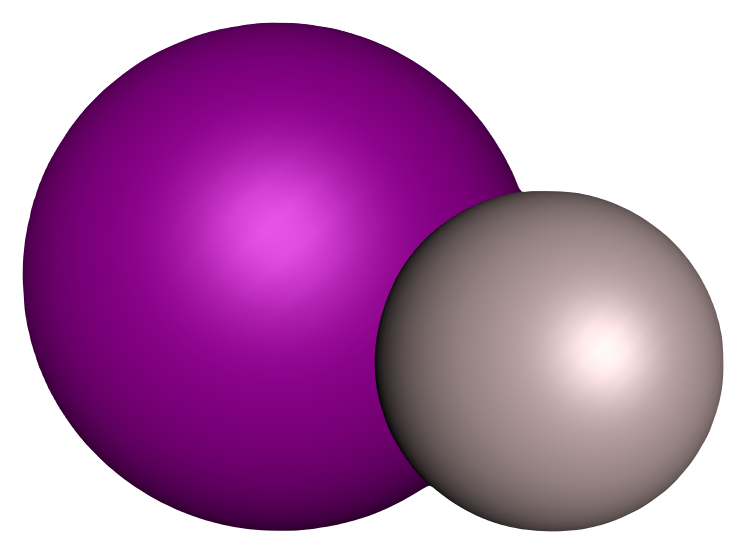

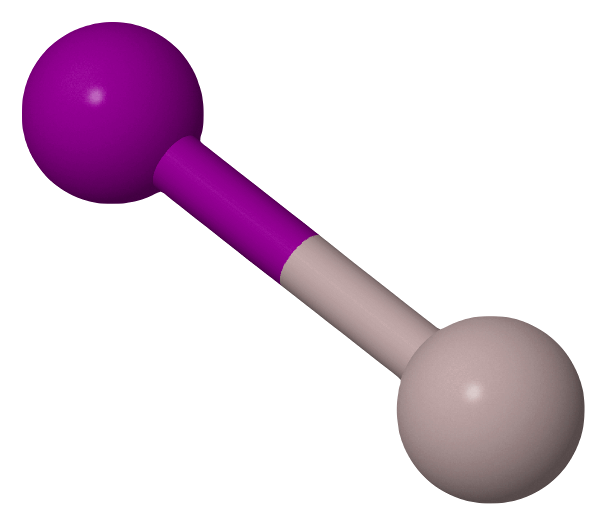

Names
- IUPAC name Iodoaluminium
- Other names Aluminium monoiodide

Identifiers
CAS Number	29977-41-1
3D model (JSmol)	Interactive image
ChemSpider	4575742
PubChem CID	5462992
CompTox Dashboard (EPA)	DTXSID20184073
- InChI: Key: FZZOCDAQJJZXMD-UHFFFAOYSA-M; Key: FZZOCDAQJJZXMD-FQOILMFZAA
- SMILES: [Al]I

Properties
Chemical formula	AlI
Molar mass	153.886 g/mol
Appearance	Red solid
- Except where otherwise noted, data are given for materials in their standard state (at 25 °C [77 °F], 100 kPa). Infobox references

Aluminium monoiodide is an aluminium(I) compound with the chemical formula AlI. It is unstable at room temperature due to dismutation:

6 AlI → Al_{2}I_{6} + 4 Al

It forms a cyclic adduct Al_{4}I_{4}(NEt_{3})_{4} with triethylamine.

== See also ==
- Aluminium monofluoride
- Aluminium monochloride
- Aluminium monobromide
