= Aluminium monofluoride =

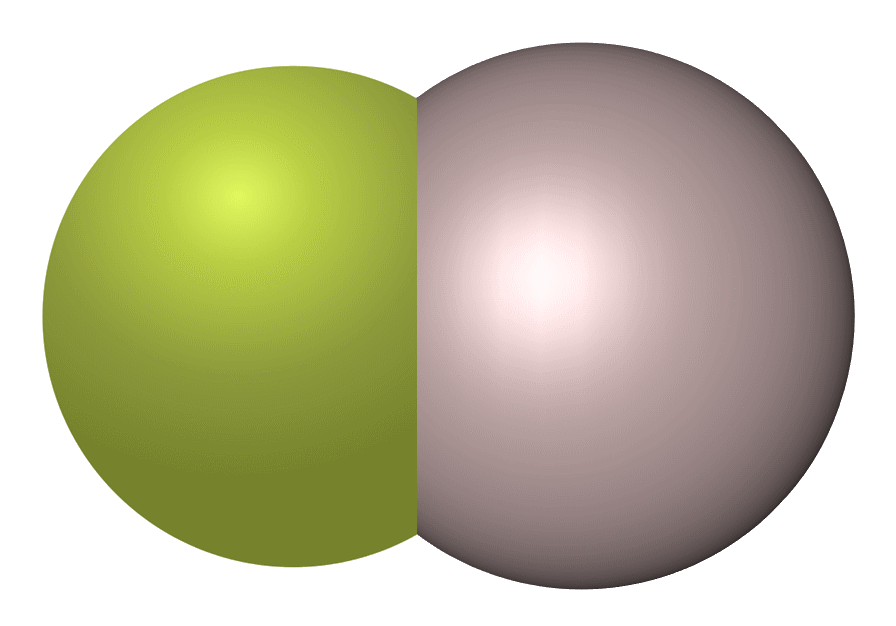

Names
- IUPAC name Fluoridoaluminium

Identifiers
CAS Number	13595-82-9
3D model (JSmol)	Interactive image
ChEBI	CHEBI:49464
ChemSpider	4576555
PubChem CID	5464153
CompTox Dashboard (EPA)	DTXSID501313685
- InChI: InChI=1S/Al.FH/h;1H/q+1;/p-1 Key: APURLPHDHPNUFL-UHFFFAOYSA-M; InChI=1/Al.FH/h;1H/q+1;/p-1/rAlF/c1-2 Key: APURLPHDHPNUFL-GBQYYLROAD; InChI=1/Al.3FH/h;3*1H/q+3;;;/p-3 Key: KLZUFWVZNOTSEM-DFZHHIFOAC
- SMILES: F[Al]

Properties
Chemical formula	AlF
Molar mass	45.98 g/mol

Related compounds
Other anions	aluminium monochloride
Other cations	lithium fluoride, sodium fluoride, potassium fluoride
- Except where otherwise noted, data are given for materials in their standard state (at 25 °C [77 °F], 100 kPa). verify (what is ?) Infobox references

Aluminium monofluoride, also known as fluoridoaluminium, is the chemical compound with the formula AlF. This elusive species is formed by the reaction between aluminium trifluoride and metallic aluminium at elevated temperatures but quickly reverts to the reactants when cooled. Clusters derived from related aluminium(I) halides can be stabilized using specialized ligands.

This molecule has been detected in the interstellar medium, where molecules are so dilute that intermolecular collisions are unimportant.

== See also ==
- Aluminium monobromide
- Aluminium monochloride
- Aluminium monoiodide
