= Aluminium chloride =

Chemical compound

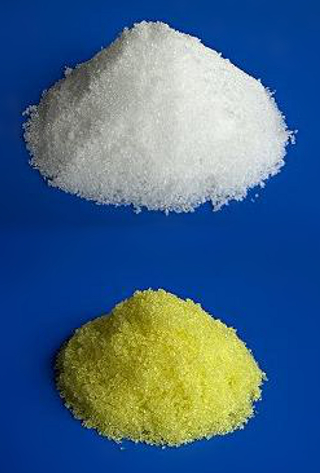
- Aluminium(III) chloride Aluminium trichloride hexahydrate, pure (top), and contaminated with iron(III) chloride (bottom)

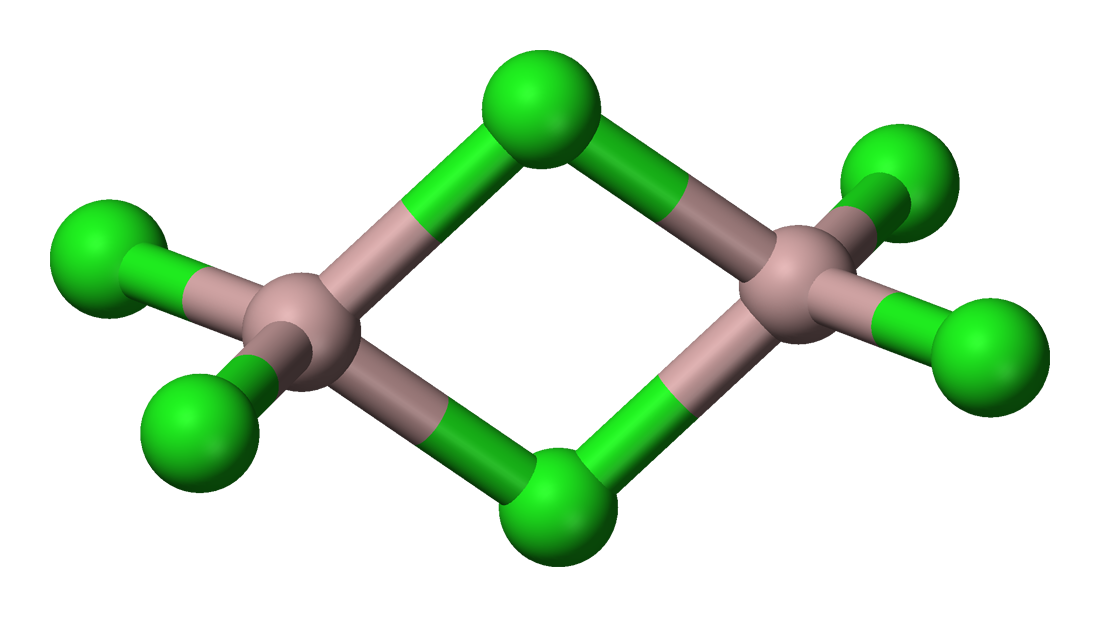
Aluminium trichloride dimer
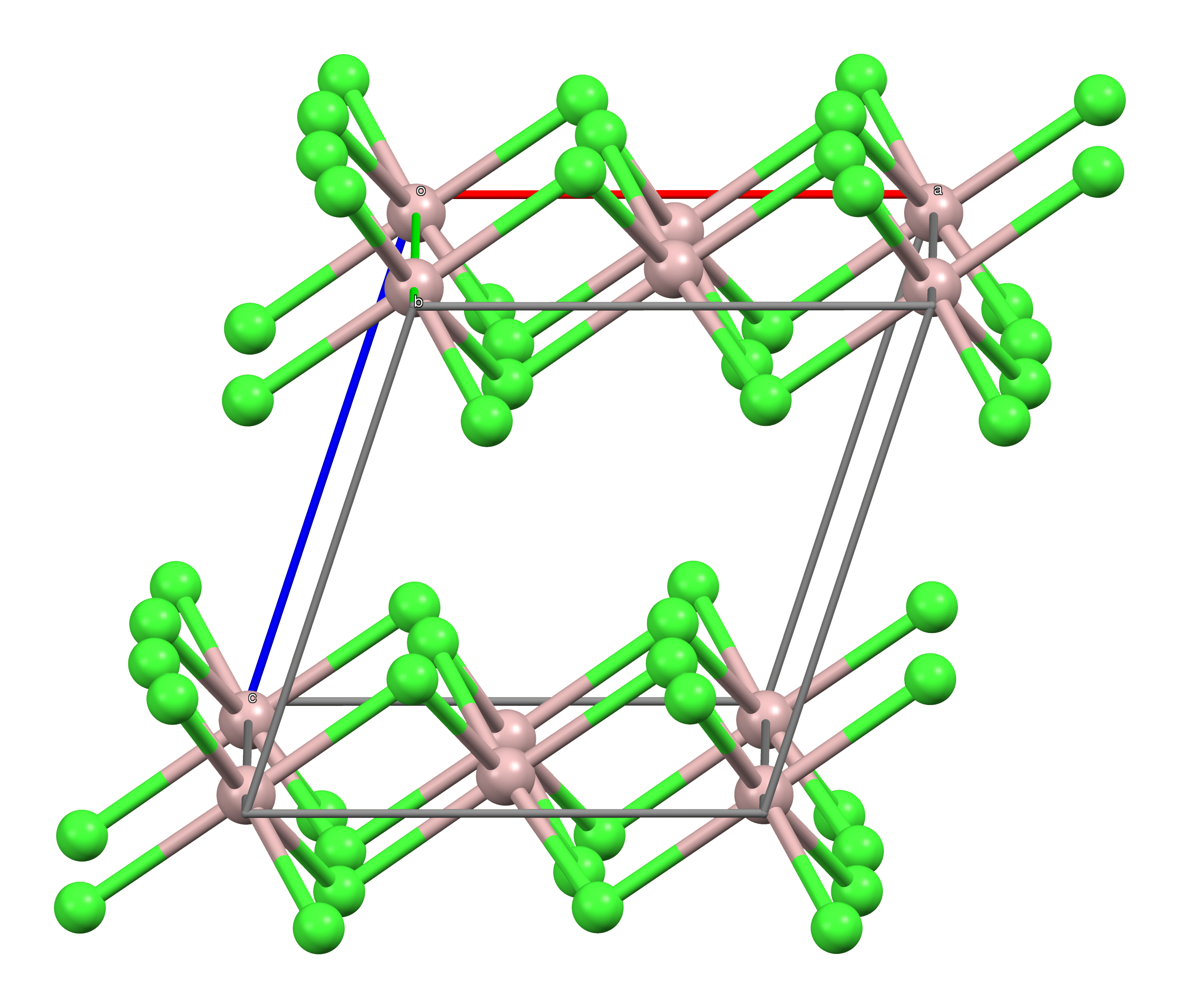
Aluminium trichloride unit cell

Names
- IUPAC name Aluminium chloride
- Other names Aluminium(III) chloride Aluminium trichloride Trichloroaluminum

Identifiers
CAS Number	7446-70-0 (anhydrous); 10124-27-3 (hydrate); 7784-13-6 (hexahydrate)
3D model (JSmol)	monomer: Interactive image; dimer: Interactive image; hexahydrate: Interactive image
ChEBI	CHEBI:30114
ChemSpider	22445
ECHA InfoCard	100.028.371
EC Number	231-208-1
Gmelin Reference	1876
PubChem CID	24012
RTECS number	BD0530000
UNII	LIF1N9568Y; 3CYT62D3GA (hexahydrate)
CompTox Dashboard (EPA)	DTXSID6029674
- InChI: InChI=1S/Al.3ClH/h;3*1H/q+3;;;/p-3 Key: VSCWAEJMTAWNJL-UHFFFAOYSA-K; InChI=1/Al.3ClH/h;3*1H/q+3;;;/p-3 Key: VSCWAEJMTAWNJL-DFZHHIFOAR
- SMILES: monomer: Cl[Al](Cl)Cl; dimer: Cl[Al-]1(Cl)[Cl+][Al-]([Cl+]1)(Cl)Cl; hexahydrate: [OH2+][Al-3]([OH2+])([OH2+])([OH2+])([OH2+])[OH2+].[Cl-].[Cl-].[Cl-]

Properties
Chemical formula	AlCl_{3}
Molar mass	133.341 g/mol (anhydrous); 241.432 g/mol (hexahydrate)
Appearance	Colourless crystals, hygroscopic
Density	2.48 g/cm^{3} (anhydrous); 2.398 g/cm^{3} (hexahydrate)
Melting point	180 °C (356 °F; 453 K) (anhydrous, sublimes); 100 °C (212 °F; 373 K) (hexahydrate, decomposes)
Solubility in water	439 g/L (0 °C); 449 g/L (10 °C); 458 g/L (20 °C); 466 g/L (30 °C); 473 g/L (40 °C); 481 g/L (60 °C); 486 g/L (80 °C); 490 g/L (100 °C)
Solubility	Soluble in hydrogen chloride, ethanol, chloroform, carbon tetrachloride; Slightly soluble in benzene
Vapor pressure	133.3 Pa (99 °C); 13.3 kPa (151 °C)
Viscosity	0.35 cP (197 °C); 0.26 cP (237 °C)

Structure
Crystal structure	Monoclinic, mS16
Space group	C12/m1, No. 12
Lattice constant	a = 0.591 nm, b = 0.591 nm, c = 1.752 nm
Lattice volume (V)	0.52996 nm^{3}
Formula units (Z)	6
Coordination geometry	Octahedral (solid); Tetrahedral (liquid)
Molecular shape	Trigonal planar (monomeric vapour)

Thermochemistry
Heat capacity (C)	91.1 J/(mol·K) (solid); 125.5 J/(mol K) (liquid); 82.46 J/(mol K) (gas)
Std molar entropy (S^{⦵}_{298})	109.3 J/(mol·K) (solid); 172.91 J/(mol·K) (liquid); 314.44 J/(mol·K) (gas)
Std enthalpy of formation (Δ_{f}H^{⦵}_{298})	−704.2 kJ/mol (solid) −674.80 kJ/mol (liquid) -584.59 kJ/mol (gas)
Gibbs free energy (Δ_{f}G^{⦵})	−628.8 kJ/mol

Pharmacology
ATC code	D10AX01 (WHO)

Hazards
- GHS labelling
Pictograms	(GHS05: Corrosive)
Signal word	Danger
Hazard statements	H314
Precautionary statements	P260, P280, P301+P330+P331, P303+P361+P353, P305+P351+P338+P310, P310
NFPA 704 (fire diamond)	3 0 2 W
- Lethal dose or concentration (LD, LC)
LD_{50} (median dose)	380 mg/kg, rat (oral, anhydrous); 3311 mg/kg, rat (oral, hexahydrate)
- NIOSH (US health exposure limits)
PEL (Permissible)	None
REL (Recommended)	2 mg/m^{3}
IDLH (Immediate danger)	N.D.

Related compounds
Other anions	Aluminium fluoride; Aluminium bromide; Aluminium iodide
Other cations	Boron trichloride; Gallium trichloride; Indium(III) chloride; Thallium(III) chloride
Related Lewis acids	Iron(III) chloride; Boron trifluoride
Related compounds	Magnesium chloride; Scandium(III) chloride; Yttrium(III) chloride

Supplementary data page
- Aluminium chloride (data page)
- Except where otherwise noted, data are given for materials in their standard state (at 25 °C [77 °F], 100 kPa). verify (what is ?) Infobox references

Aluminium chloride, also known as aluminium trichloride, is an inorganic compound with the formula AlCl_{3}. It forms a hexahydrate with the formula [Al(H_{2}O)_{6}]Cl_{3}, containing six water molecules of hydration. Both the anhydrous form and the hexahydrate are colourless crystals, but samples are often contaminated with iron(III) chloride, giving them a yellow colour.

The anhydrous form is commercially important. It has a low melting and boiling point. It is mainly produced and consumed in the production of aluminium, but large amounts are also used in other areas of the chemical industry. The compound is often cited as a Lewis acid. It is an inorganic compound that reversibly changes from a polymer to a monomer at mild temperature.

== Structure ==
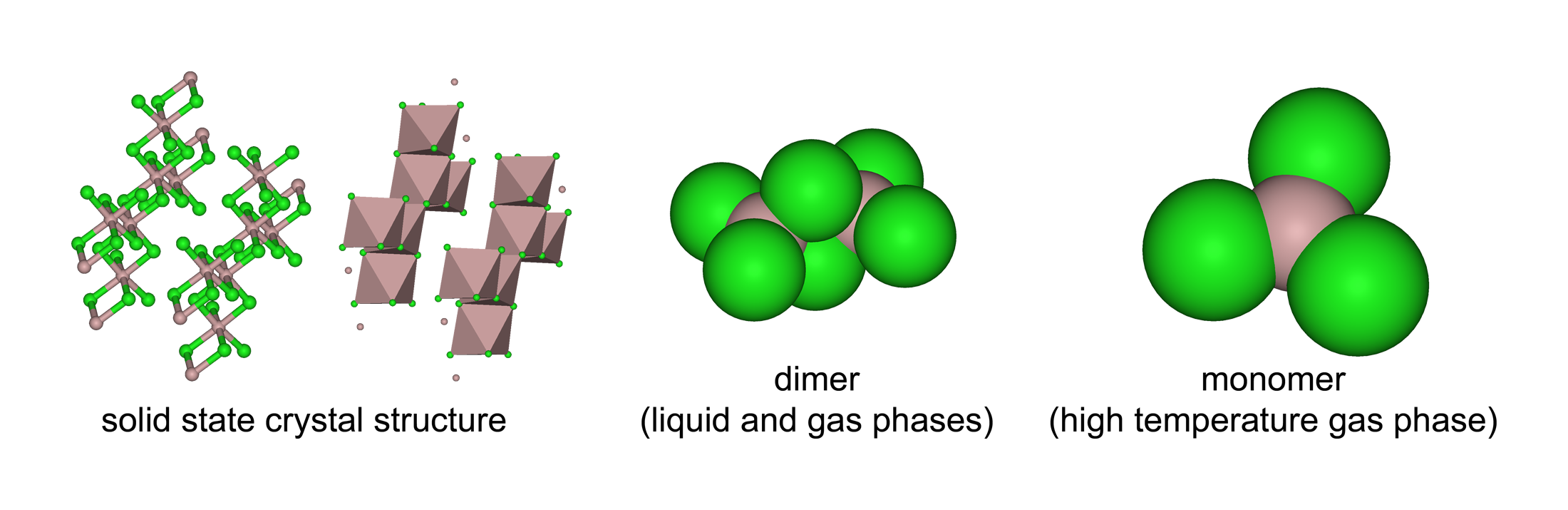
Illustration of structures of aluminium chloride

=== Anhydrous ===
AlCl_{3} adopts three structures, depending on the temperature and the state (solid, liquid, gas). Solid AlCl_{3} has a sheet-like layered structure with cubic close-packed chloride ions. In this framework, the Al centres exhibit octahedral coordination geometry. Yttrium(III) chloride adopts the same structure, as do a range of other compounds. When aluminium trichloride is in its melted state, it exists as the dimer (Al_{2}Cl_{6} point group D_{2h}), with tetracoordinate aluminium. This change in structure is related to the lower density of the liquid phase (1.78 g/cm^{3}) versus solid aluminium trichloride (2.48 g/cm^{3}). Al_{2}Cl_{6} dimers are also found in the vapour phase. At higher temperatures, the Al_{2}Cl_{6} dimers dissociate into trigonal planar AlCl_{3} monomer (point group D_{3h}), which is structurally analogous to BF_{3}. The melt conducts electricity poorly, unlike more ionic halides such as sodium chloride.

=== Hexahydrate ===
The hexahydrate consists of octahedral [Al(H_{2}O)_{6}]^{3+} cation centers and chloride anions (Cl^{−}) as counterions. Hydrogen bonds link the cation and anions. The hydrated form of aluminium chloride has an octahedral molecular geometry, with the central aluminium ion surrounded by six water ligand molecules. Being coordinatively saturated, the hydrate is of little value as a catalyst in Friedel-Crafts alkylation and related reactions.

== Uses ==
=== Alkylation and acylation of arenes ===
AlCl_{3} is a common Lewis-acid catalyst for Friedel-Crafts reactions, both acylations and alkylations. These types of reactions are the major use for aluminium chloride, for example, in the preparation of anthraquinone (used in the dyestuffs industry) from benzene and phosgene. In the general Friedel-Crafts reaction, an acyl chloride or alkyl halide reacts with an aromatic system as shown:

The alkylation reaction is more widely used than the acylation reaction, although its practice is more technically demanding. For both reactions, the aluminium chloride, as well as other materials and the equipment, should be dry, although a trace of moisture is necessary for the reaction to proceed. Detailed procedures are available for alkylation and acylation of arenes.

A general problem with the Friedel-Crafts reaction is that the aluminium chloride catalyst sometimes is required in full stoichiometric quantities, because it complexes strongly with the products. This complication always generates a large amount of corrosive waste. For these and similar reasons, the use of aluminium chloride has rarely been displaced by zeolites.

Aluminium chloride can also be used to introduce aldehyde groups onto aromatic rings, for example via the Gattermann-Koch reaction which uses carbon monoxide, hydrogen chloride and a copper(I) chloride co-catalyst.

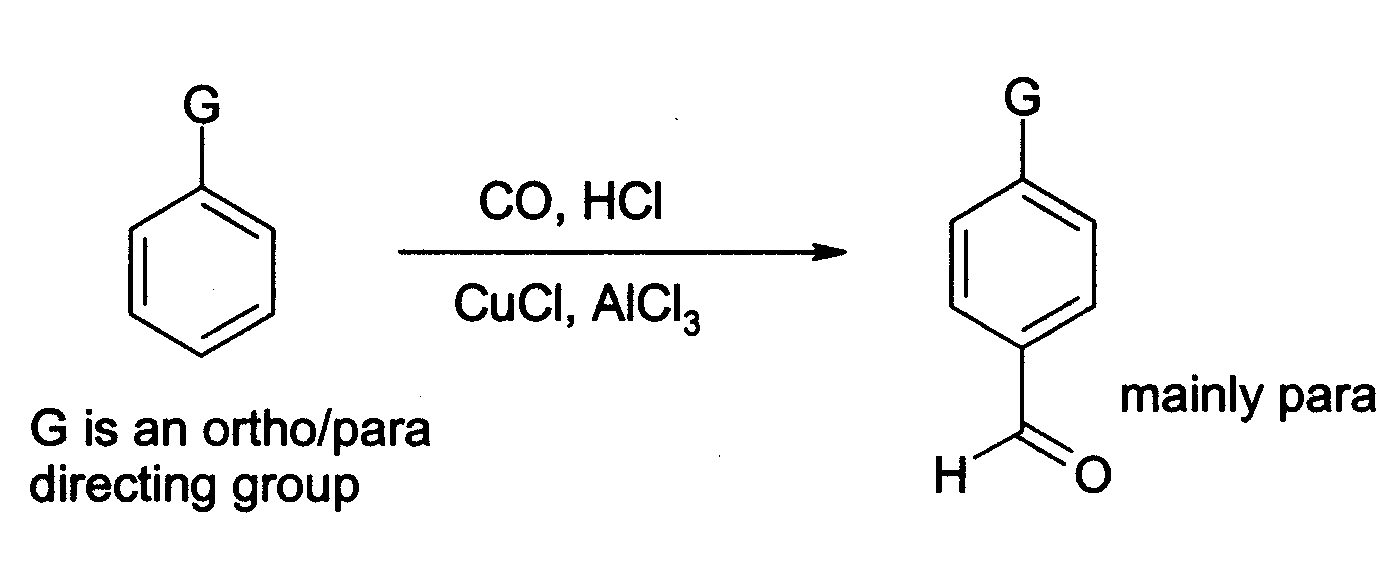

=== Other applications in organic and organometallic synthesis ===
Aluminium chloride finds a wide variety of other applications in organic chemistry. For example, it can catalyse the ene reaction, such as the addition of 3-buten-2-one (methyl vinyl ketone) to carvone:

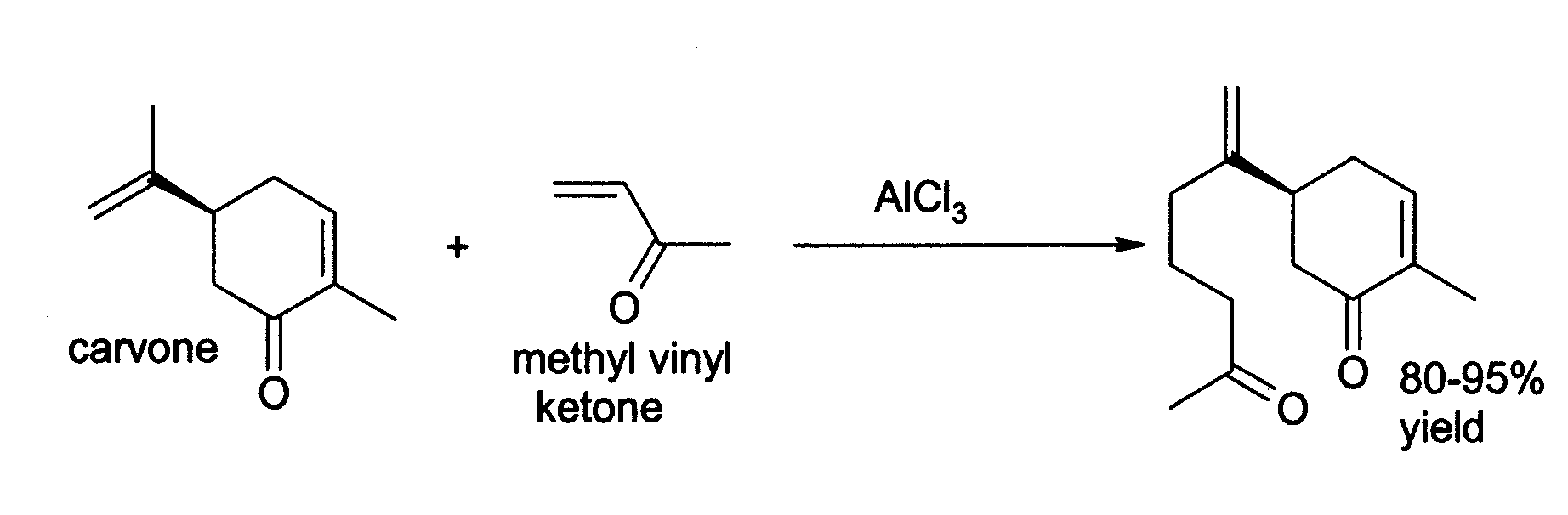

It is used to induce a variety of hydrocarbon couplings and rearrangements.

Aluminium chloride combined with aluminium in the presence of an arene can be used to synthesize bis(arene) metal complexes, e.g. bis(benzene)chromium, from certain metal halides via the Fischer–Hafner synthesis. Dichlorophenylphosphine is prepared by reaction of benzene and phosphorus trichloride catalyzed by aluminium chloride.

=== Medical ===
Aluminium chloride
Clinical data
- AHFS/Drugs.com: Monograph
- License data: US DailyMed: aluminum chloride
- Routes of administration: Topical
- ATC code: None

Identifiers
- CompTox Dashboard (EPA): DTXSID6029674
- ECHA InfoCard: 100.028.371

Data page
- Aluminium chloride (data page)

Topical aluminum chloride hexahydrate is used for the treatment of hyperhidrosis (excessive sweating).

== Reactions ==
Anhydrous aluminium chloride is a powerful Lewis acid, capable of forming Lewis acid-base adducts with even weak Lewis bases such as benzophenone and mesitylene. It forms tetrachloroaluminate ([AlCl_{4}]^{−}) in the presence of chloride ions.

Aluminium chloride reacts with calcium and magnesium hydrides in tetrahydrofuran forming tetrahydroaluminates.

=== Reactions with water ===
Anhydrous aluminium chloride is hygroscopic, having a very pronounced affinity for water. It fumes in moist air and hisses when mixed with liquid water as the Cl^{−} ligands are displaced with H_{2}O molecules to form the hexahydrate [Al(H_{2}O)_{6}]Cl_{3}. The anhydrous phase cannot be regained on heating the hexahydrate. Instead HCl is lost leaving aluminium hydroxide or alumina (aluminium oxide):

[Al(H_{2}O)_{6}]Cl_{3} → Al(OH)_{3} + 3 HCl + 3 H_{2}O

Like metal aquo complexes, aqueous AlCl_{3} is acidic owing to the ionization of the aquo ligands:

[Al(H_{2}O)_{6}]^{3+} ⇌ [Al(OH)(H_{2}O)_{5}]^{2+} + H^{+}

Aqueous solutions behave similarly to other aluminium salts containing hydrated Al^{3+} ions, giving a gelatinous precipitate of aluminium hydroxide upon reaction with dilute sodium hydroxide:

AlCl_{3} + 3 NaOH → Al(OH)_{3} + 3 NaCl

== Synthesis ==
Aluminium chloride is manufactured on a large scale by the exothermic reaction of aluminium metal with chlorine or hydrogen chloride at temperatures between 650 and 750 °C (1,202 and 1,382 °F).

2 Al + 3 Cl_{2} → 2 AlCl_{3}
2 Al + 6 HCl → 2 AlCl_{3} + 3 H_{2}

Aluminium chloride may be formed via a single displacement reaction between copper(II) chloride and aluminium.

2 Al + 3 CuCl_{2} → 2 AlCl_{3} + 3 Cu

In the US in 1993, approximately 21,000 tons were produced, not counting the amounts consumed in the production of aluminium.

Hydrated aluminium trichloride is prepared by dissolving aluminium oxides in hydrochloric acid. Metallic aluminium also readily dissolves in hydrochloric acid ─ releasing hydrogen gas and generating considerable heat. Heating this solid does not produce anhydrous aluminium trichloride, the hexahydrate decomposes to aluminium hydroxide when heated:

[Al(H_{2}O)_{6}]Cl_{3} → Al(OH)_{3} + 3 HCl + 3 H_{2}O

Aluminium also forms a lower chloride, aluminium(I) chloride (AlCl), but this is very unstable and only known in the vapour phase.

== Natural occurrence ==
Anhydrous aluminium chloride is not found as a mineral. The hexahydrate, however, is known as the rare mineral chloraluminite. A more complex, basic and hydrated aluminium chloride mineral is cadwaladerite.

== History ==
Aluminium chlorides were known in the 18th century as muriate of alumina, marine alum, argillaceous marine salt, muriated clay. It was first chemically studied in the 1830s.

== Safety ==
Anhydrous AlCl_{3} is strongly corrosive and releases hydrochloric acid in contact with water.

== See also ==
- Aluminium monochloride
