= Aluminium monobromide =

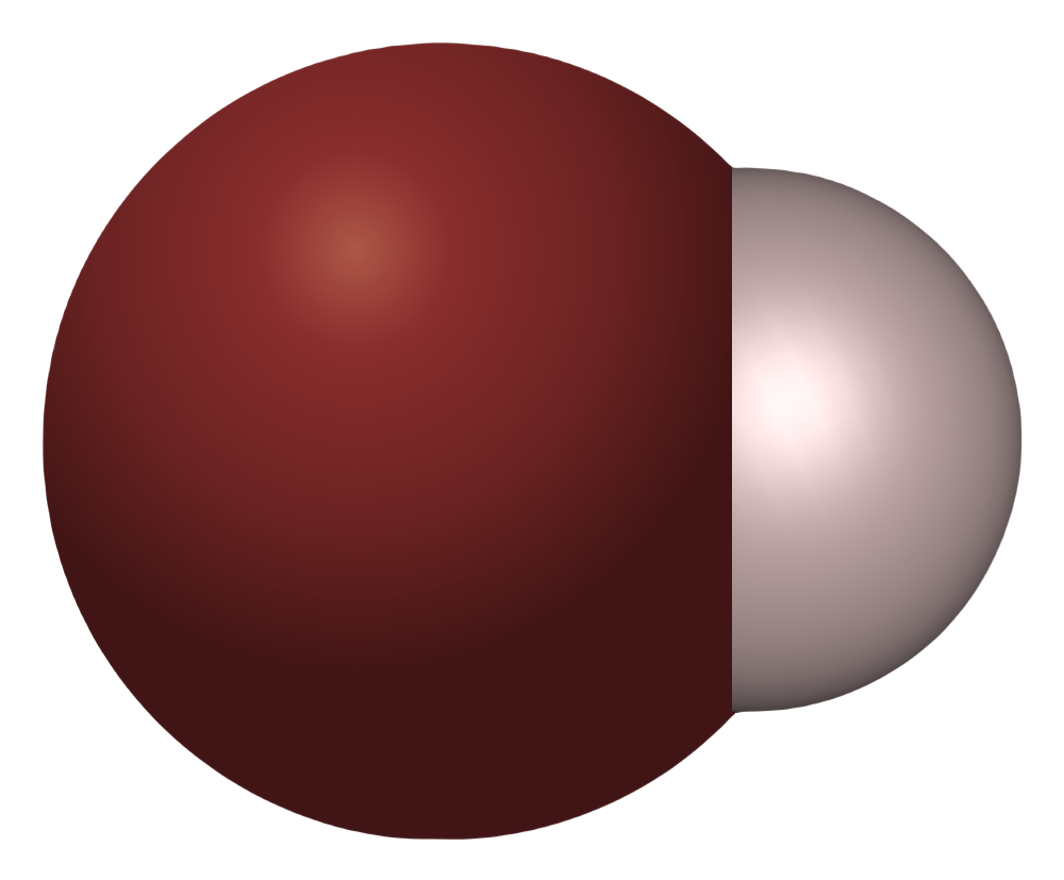

Names
- IUPAC name Bromoaluminium
- Other names Aluminum monobromide; Aluminium bromide; Aluminum bromide; Bromoaluminum

Identifiers
CAS Number	22359-97-3
3D model (JSmol)	Interactive image
ChemSpider	4514498
PubChem CID	5360392
CompTox Dashboard (EPA)	DTXSID801046558
- InChI: InChI=1S/Al.BrH/h;1H/q+1;/p-1 Key: QEBHBRUSOHBKAJ-UHFFFAOYSA-M
- SMILES: [Al]Br

Properties
Chemical formula	AlBr
Molar mass	106.886 g·mol^{−1}
- Except where otherwise noted, data are given for materials in their standard state (at 25 °C [77 °F], 100 kPa). Infobox references

Aluminium monobromide is a chemical compound with the empirical formula AlBr. It forms from the reaction of HBr with Al metal at high temperature. It disproportionates near room temperature:

6/n "[AlBr]_{n}" → Al_{2}Br_{6} + 4 Al

This reaction is reversed at temperatures higher than 1000 °C.

A more stable compound of aluminium and bromine is aluminium tribromide.

== See also ==
- Aluminium monofluoride
- Aluminium monochloride
- Aluminium monoiodide
