= Aluminium iodide =

Chemical compound

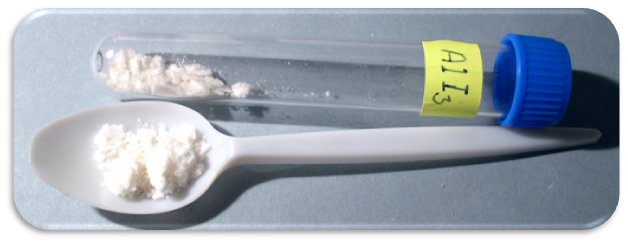
- Ball and stick model of aluminium iodide dimer

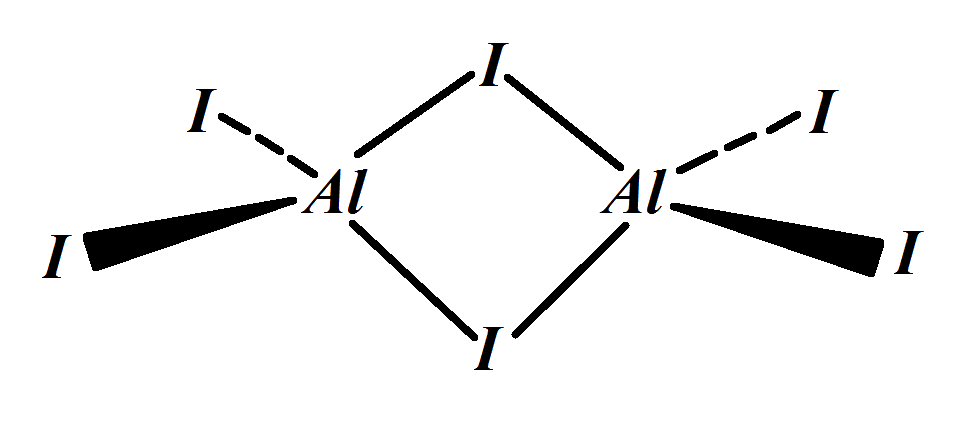

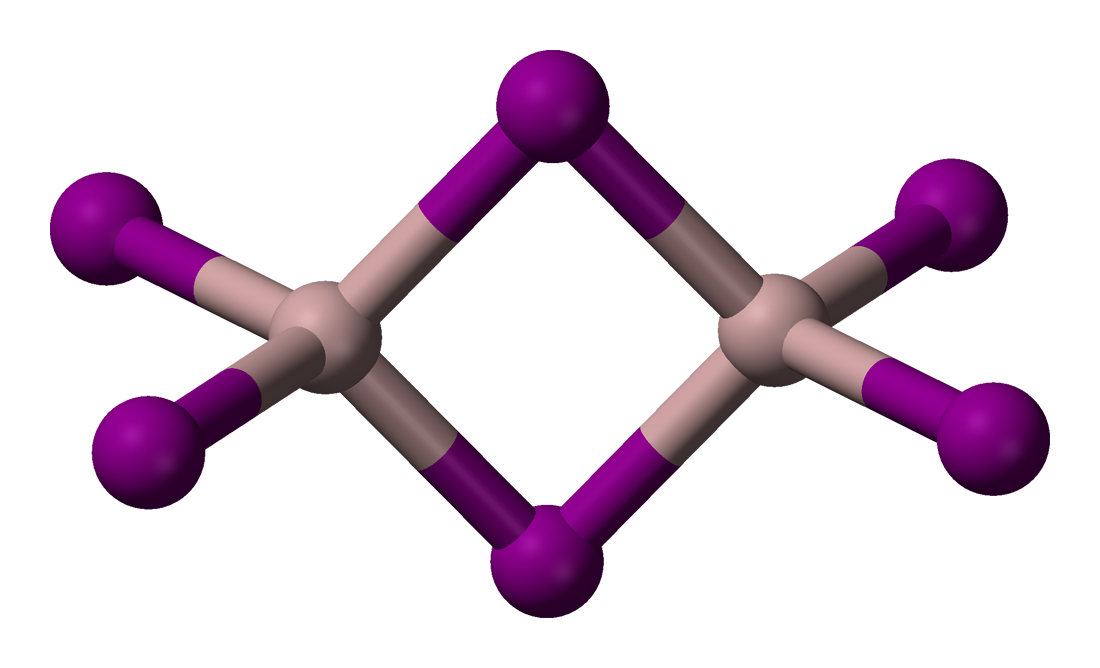

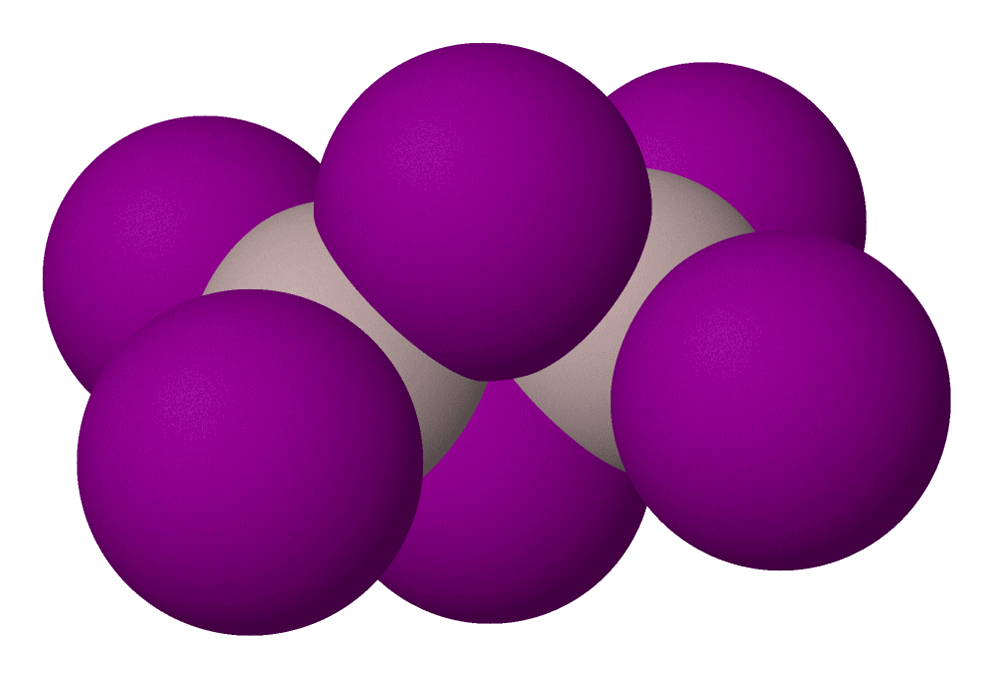

Names
- Preferred IUPAC name Aluminium iodide
- Other names Aluminium(III) iodide Aluminum iodide Aluminium triiodide Aluminum triiodide

Identifiers
CAS Number	7784-23-8 (anhydrate); 10090-53-6 (hexahydrate)
3D model (JSmol)	Interactive image; dimer: Interactive image
ChemSpider	74202 (anhydrate)
ECHA InfoCard	100.029.140
EC Number	232-054-8
PubChem CID	82222 (anhydrate)
UNII	L903Z8J9VR (anhydrate); VWS43EUO9V (hexahydrate)
UN number	UN 3260
CompTox Dashboard (EPA)	DTXSID0064838
- InChI: Key: CECABOMBVQNBEC-UHFFFAOYSA-K; Key: CECABOMBVQNBEC-DFZHHIFOAE
- SMILES: I[Al](I)I; dimer: I[Al-]1(I)[I+][Al-]([I+]1)(I)I

Properties
Chemical formula	AlI_{3}, AlI_{3}·6H_{2}O (hexahydrate)
Molar mass	407.695 g/mol (anhydrous); 515.786 g/mol (hexahydrate)
Appearance	white (anhydrous) or yellow powder (hexahydrate)
Density	3.98 g/cm^{3} (anhydrous) 2.63 g/cm^{3} (hexahydrate)
Melting point	188.28 °C (370.90 °F; 461.43 K) (anhydrous); 185 °C, decomposes (hexahydrate)
Boiling point	382 °C (720 °F; 655 K) anhydrous, sublimes
Solubility in water	very soluble, partial hydrolysis
Solubility in alcohol, ether	soluble (hexahydrate)

Structure
Crystal structure	Monoclinic, mP16
Space group	P2_{1}/c, No. 14
Lattice constant	a = 1.1958 nm, b = 0.6128 nm, c = 1.8307 nm α = 90°, β = 90°, γ = 90°
Formula units (Z)	8

Thermochemistry
Heat capacity (C)	98.7 J/(mol·K)
Std molar entropy (S^{⦵}_{298})	195.9 J/(mol·K)
Std enthalpy of formation (Δ_{f}H^{⦵}_{298})	−302.9 kJ/mol
- Except where otherwise noted, data are given for materials in their standard state (at 25 °C [77 °F], 100 kPa). verify (what is ?) Infobox references

Aluminium iodide is the inorganic compound with the composition AlI_{3}. It also exists a various hydrates formed by exposure of the anhydrous material to water. For example the hexahydrate is obtained from a reaction between metallic aluminum or aluminum hydroxide with hydroiodic acid. Like the related chloride and bromide, AlI_{3} is a strong Lewis acid and will absorb water from the atmosphere. It is employed as a reagent for the scission of certain kinds of C-O and N-O bonds. It cleaves aryl ethers and deoxygenates epoxides.

== Preparation ==
Aluminium iodide is formed by the reaction of aluminium and iodine or the action of HI on Al metal.

== Structure ==
Solid AlI_{3} is dimeric, consisting of Al_{2}I_{6}, similar to that of AlBr_{3}. The structure of monomeric and dimeric forms have been characterized in the gas phase. The monomer, AlI_{3}, is trigonal planar with a bond length of 2.448(6) Å, and the bridged dimer, Al_{2}I_{6}, at 430 K is a similar to Al_{2}Cl_{6} and Al_{2}Br_{6} with Al−I bond lengths of 2.456(6) Å (terminal) and 2.670(8) Å (bridging). The dimer is described as floppy with an equilibrium geometry of D_{2h}.

== Aluminium(I) iodide ==
Experiment showing a direct synthesis of aluminum iodide. Few drops of water are added to a homogenised mixture of aluminum powder and powdered iodine. After short time (an induction period) a vigorous reaction occurs followed by emission of intense colored vapors. The purple vapours are due to evaporation of iodine as a consequence of increased temperature of the system, and the brown ones are probably due to smoke of an adduct of the reaction product with excess of iodine. The exergonic reaction 2Al(s) + 3I_{2}(s) → 2AlI_{3}(s) is at the origin of the phenomenon observed.

The name "aluminium iodide" is widely assumed to describe the triiodide or its dimer. In fact, a monoiodide also enjoys a role in the Al–I system, although the compound AlI is unstable at room temperature relative to the triiodide:

3 AlI → AlI_{3} + 2 Al

An illustrative derivative of aluminium monoiodide is the cyclic adduct formed with triethylamine, Al_{4}I_{4}(NEt_{3})_{4}.
