= Henri Lafond =

French mining engineer and businessman

- Born: 20 August 1894; Thaumiers, Cher, France
- Died: 6 March 1963 (aged 68); Neuilly-sur-Seine, France
- Cause of death: Assassination by gunshot
- Occupations: Banker and businessman

Henri Lafond (20 August 1894 – 6 March 1963) was a French mining engineer and businessman who headed or sat on the board of numerous large companies and was involved in various industrial associations and committees both before and after World War II (1939–45). During the war he held a senior position in the Vichy government's Ministry of Industrial Production from 1940 to 1942. He was assassinated in March 1963 by an OAS member for refusing to support the movement to oppose Algerian independence.

== Early years (1894–1939) ==
Henri Lafond was born on 20 August 1894 in Thaumiers, Cher. His parents were Joseph Lafond, a tobacconist, and Juliette Alexandrine Guénard. His father was the son of a laborer. Henri Lafond studied at the Thaumiers commune school, then at the Bourges lycée. He entered the École Polytechnique in 1914. He was described as having brown hair, vertical brow, straight nose, chestnut eyes, oval face, height 172 centimetres (68 in). Lafond was awarded the Croix de guerre for his service in World War I. He entered the École des Mines de Paris in 1919, and graduated in 1920 second out of 145 students. He became a member of the Corps des mines. Lafond married a Mlle. Thivet. Their children were Hélène and Jacqueline, who both married doctors.

Lafond left the Corps des Mines in 1929 to join the Banque Mirabaud. The Mirabaud Bank specialised in mining and associated industries. Lafond was made head of its subsidiary, the Association minière, in 1930. He became a director of many mining companies. He became a director of the Compagnie des Mines du Huaron, and a managing director of the Litcho Gold Mines in 1935. In 1939 he was director of the Compagnie marocaine representing the Banque Mirabaud.

== World War II (1939–45) ==
During World War II Lafond was close to men considered to be members of the Synarchy. René Belin was made Minister of Industrial Production in July 1940 in Marshal Philippe Pétain's government. He appointed Jean Bichelonne and Henri Lafond to the two senior positions in the ministry. On 12 August 1940 Petain called for the various social committees to merge into "families" in an effort to reduce overhead. Lafond proposed to merge the 11 iron and steel committees into a metallurgy family headed by Jules Aubrun. Aubrun accepted this in principle in November 1941, but wanted fewer committees in the family. In the end, no progress was made.

In the government of Pierre Laval formed on 18 April 1942 the Ministry of Industry was headed by Jean Bichelonne with Henri Lafond as general secretary for energy and René Norguet (1888–1968) as general secretary for industrial production. Lafond's Energy secretariat included sections for mines, steel, gas/electricity and fuel. Lafond was finally dismissed in November 1942. This seems to have been engineered by Laval due to his personal dislike.

After leaving the government Lafond was appointed president and CEO of the Association minière and joined the Mirabaud Group, long-time partner of the Banque de l'Union Parisienne (BUP). From 1943 he was president of the Mines du Huaron and on the board of Tréfileries et Laminoirs du Havre. He joined the executive committee of the BUP in January 1944.

== Post World War II (1945–63) ==
In the post-war period Lafond maintained contact with the people with whom he had worked during the war, and the "Lafond Group" met for monthly lunches for the rest of his life. The members of the group, almost all engineers, represented oil, power, mining, steel and industrial chemistry. Lafond worked with Pierre Ricard and Henri Davezac to form the Conseil national du patronat français (CNPF), representing French employers, with Georges Villiers as the first president. Because he had left the Vichy regime soon enough, he was able to play a leading role in the CNPF, although he remained a believer in most of the Vichy regime's Comités d'Organization principles. He was a "modernist", and thought employees were entitled to certain rights, which should be regulated by law. From 1947 to 1954 he was a member of the CNPF Economic and Social Council, representing a group of private industrial companies.

Lafond had many contacts among the senior administrators of France and the leaders of major companies. His voice was heard by General Charles de Gaulle. Lafond sat on the Comité Franc-Dollar and the École polytechnique development council. In April 1951 Lafond was tentatively appointed to the new Commissariat à l'énergie atomique (Atomic Energy Committee). This appointment was strongly opposed by Francis Perrin, expected to be the High Commissioner, based on Lafond's background in the Vichy regime and his many private interests. Perrin blocked the appointment by threatening to resign.

Lafond was chairman and chief executive officer of the Société du Djebel-Djérissa from 1945 to 1962. He was a director of the Banque de l'Union Parisienne, the Société des Phosphates de Gafsa, the Société de l'Ouenza, the Société française des pétroles, the Société commerciale d'affrètements et de combustibles, Chantiers et Ateliers de Saint-Nazaire from 1947, Pechiney from 1948 and Électricité de France from 1949. Lafond became vice-president of the BUP in 1948, and became CEO of the BUP in 1951. In 1953, in great secrecy, he arranged the merger of the BUP with the Mirabaud Bank. Mirabaud's portfolio included large investments in the mining and oil sectors. The bank controlled the Société Mokta El Hadid. Lafond headed the Mokta company until his death in 1963. Lafond was also head of the Société Anonyme Chérifienne d'Etudes Minières (SACEM). In 1962 he joined the board of Tréfimétaux, formed by a merger of the Tréfileries et Laminoirs du Havre and the Compagnie française des métaux.

Henri Lafond became a knight of the Legion of Honour on 28 January 1939. He was appointed an Officer of the Legion of Honour of 5 September 1949, and Commander of the Legion of Honour on 18 June 1959. While leaving his house in Neuilly-sur-Seine, Hauts-de-Seine, on 6 March 1963 he was killed by several revolver bullets. The killer, OAS member Jean de Brem, fled the scene. He'd killed Lafond for refusing to testify on behalf of the defendants at the Petit-Clamart trial. At the time of his death, Henri Lafond owned 0.26% of the capital of the BUP. Jean de Brem was shot and killed by the French police on 18 April 1963.

== Sources ==
- Bonin, Hubert (2001), La Banque de l'Union parisienne (1874/1904 – 1974) (in French), Paris: Editions Plage – via Annales des Mines
- Brunet, Luc-André (2017-06-08), Forging Europe: Industrial Organisation in France, 1940–1952, Springer, ISBN 978-1-349-95198-7
- "Compagnie des Minerais de Fer Magnétique De Mokta-el-Hadid" (PDF), Entreprises Coloniales (in French), 5 July 2015
- Ehrmann, Henry Walter (2015-12-08), Organized Business in France, Princeton University Press, ISBN 978-1-4008-7832-1
- Fischesser, Raymond, Groupe LAFOND (in French), Annales des Mines
- Garric, Alain, "Henri LAFOND " le pape du Corps des Mines "", geneanet (in French)
- Lafond, Henri (in French), Légion d'Honneur
- Mahl, R., "Henri LAFOND (1894–1963)", Annales des Mines (in French)
- Nord, Philip (2012-08-26), France's New Deal: From the Thirties to the Postwar Era, Princeton University Press, ISBN 978-1-4008-3496-9
- Scheinman, Lawrence (2015-12-08), Atomic Energy Policy in France Under the Fourth Republic, Princeton University Press, ISBN 978-1-4008-7619-8
- Timkkit, Boutazoult Imini (4 May 2008), ASSASSINAT D'UN PDG DE LA SACEM : MARS 1963 (in French)
- Zølner, Mette (2009), Young Business Leaders: Between Utility and Utopia, Peter Lang, ISBN 978-90-5201-541-5
