= Compagnie française des métaux =

French metallurgy company

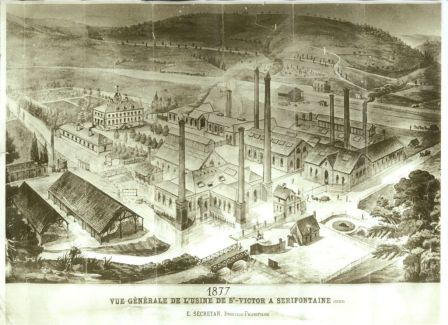
- The factory at Sérifontaine in 1877
- Industry: Metallurgy
- Founded: 1892
- Defunct: 1962
- Fate: Merged
- Successor: Tréfimétaux
- Headquarters: Courbevoie, Hauts-de-Seine, France

The Compagnie française des métaux (CFM) was a French metallurgy company founded in 1892 that acquired the assets of a predecessor that had gone into liquidation. The company operated a number of plants in different locations in France, mainly making copper and aluminum products. In 1962 it was merged with Tréfileries et Laminoirs du Havre to form Tréfimétaux.

== Predecessors ==
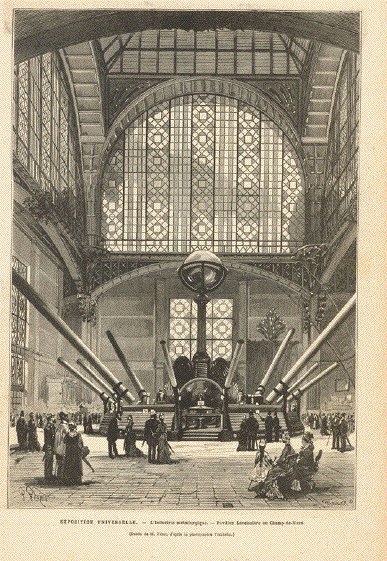
Pavillon Laveissiere at the 1878 Exposition Universelle

The Société J. Laveissière et Cie was founded in 1812 to manufacture copper products. The Compagnie française des métaux was created in 1867 in Saint-Denis on a 3 hectares (7.4 acres) site. It processed red copper and brass, and employed 500 workers. The plant was at 72 rue Ambroise Croisat.

In 1869 Pierre-Eugène Secrétan (1836–1899) bought a copper and brass mill in the village of Sérifontaine on the Epte river about 85 kilometres (53 mi) northwest of Paris. The plant had been set up by the d’Arlincourt family in 1833–35 as a zinc and brass foundry and rolling mill. Secrétan later donated the copper sheets that cover the Statue of Liberty, built in 1875–76. In 1873, at the request of the French government, Secrétan overhauled a mill to make brass sheets for cartridges at Castelsarrasin, near Toulouse. The factory came into full operation in 1885–86. In 1878 Secrétan bought the Givet copper and brass plant beside the Meuse river on the Belgian border, perhaps the largest such factory in France. That year the Société industrielle des métaux created at Fromelennes-les-Givet.

In 1881 the Société J. Laveissière et Cie was merged with Secrétan's Société anonyme des établissements Secrétan to form the Société industrielle et commerciale des métaux. With additional smaller acquisitions the combined company produced about 25,000 tonnes of copper products annually, or about 10% of total world production. In 1887 Secrétan decided to bypass the London traders and form a syndicate to buy all copper offered by the copper miners and producers at a fixed price higher than the current market price. He was gambling on being able to corner the copper market, but demand did not rise as fast as he predicted and he did not account for new sources of supply or the potential of existing scrap. In 1889 Secrétan's company and its bank, the Comptoir national d'escompte de Paris, both went bankrupt.^{(fr)}

== History ==
The Compagnie française des métaux (CFM) was founded in 1892 as a société anonyme. It had capital of 75,500,000 francs. In 1892 the President of the Crédit Industriel et Commercial (CIC) bank, was president of the company. There was no dominant founder or founding family. The CFM took over the assets of the bankrupt Société Industrielle et Commerciale des Métaux in 1893. In 1894 Jacques Edouard Melon (1846–1899), was named director-general and consulting engineer of the Compagnie française des métaux. The board also named Messrs. Mesureur and Hippolyte Fontaine (Note: The engineer Hippolyte Fontaine (1833-1910) had worked with the Chemins de fer du Nord, in 1865 was chief engineer for construction of the docks of Saint-Ouen, was director of a company to produce an electric dynamo machine, organized the first International Exposition of Electricity in Paris in 1881 and founded the L'éclairage électrique (Electric Lighting) company in 1887.) as administrators.

Georges Vésier (1858–1938) was appointed an administrator of the company in 1895, and was appointed President and managing director in 1899. He held important roles in the company until his death in 1938. Georges Vésier proved a strong leader of the Compagnie française des métaux. Émile Demenge, a graduate of the École Polytechnique in 1880, was for many years the only polytechnicien in the company's management, which was dominated by alumni of the École Centrale Paris. However, he reached the position of Managing Director (administrateur délégué). During World War I (1914–18) the company's Ardennes factory was occupied. As of 1924 the CFM had a capital of 40 million francs. In 1930 the company charged Edmond Brion and Auguste Cadet with building a two-story branch in Fez, Morocco, with storage facilities, retail stores and offices on the ground floor and three apartments above.

From 1938 to 1956 Henri Thélier, President of the Crédit Industriel et Commercial, was president of CFM. At the end of World War II the company found itself with low stocks, obsolete equipment and intense competition from abroad. CFM concluded agreements with other companies under which they would each specialize in two or three different lines of business, and agree not to compete. This arrangement lasted for twelve years, and allowed for focused modernization of plant. In the early 1950s the company had capital of 1,492.5 million francs and interests in the Société des Munitions d'Artillerie, Société de Fonderies et Laminoirs d'Honfleur, Forges de Bar-sur Aube, Etablissements Le Maréchal, Société Métaux et Alliages, Sociétés des Etablissements Charpentier, Vogt et Garogne, Compagnie Marocaine de Métaux et d'Entreprises, Laminoirs et Tréfileries d'Afrique, Alais Froges, Société Centrale des Alliages Légers, Société Metallurgique de Gerzat-Studal, Laminoirs et Tréfileries de la Nouvelle Gullia, Société pour la Fabrication de Bouteilles Métalliques and Compagnie Française du Bi-Métal.

Georges Desbrière joined the CFM in 1925 as an engineer, became a director, and then general manager in 1938. In 1948 he was appointed director and general manager. He was president of the Chambre Syndicale des Métaux from 1945 to 1950. In 1952 he joined the Paris Chamber of Commerce as treasurer. Desbrière (b. 1901) was CEO from 1956 to 1962 of the CFM. In 1962 the Compagnie française des métaux merged with the Tréfileries et Laminoirs du Havre to form Tréfimétaux. Georges Desbrière continued as CEO of Tréfimétaux from 1962 to 1967.

Raoul Collet (1917–2004) was a manufacturing engineer at the Givet factory in 1942, then at Villeurbanne in 1943. He was head of mechanical and electrical maintenance at Givet in 1945. and director of the Villeurbanne factory in 1946. In 1950 he was appointed deputy-director of the Sérifontaine factory, in 1951 director of the Givet factory and in 1955 director of the Couèron factory. He became chief engineer of the factories and then Technical Director in 1963. He continued to rise through the ranks at Tréfimétaux, and was president of that organization in 1980–82.

== Facilities ==
Locations in France

The factory of the Compagnie française des Métaux at 72 rue de la Gare in Saint Denis has been rehabilitated and converted and still stood as of 2018. A sample of other plants built or acquired by the company follows.

=== Bar-sur-Aube ===
The Société Thuillier, Dague et Cie bought a site along the avenue du Général Leclerc at the western entrance to Bar-sur-Aube in 1902, and created a small stamping workshop. The Bogny-Braux foundry bought the factory during World War I, and around 1930 it was acquired by the Compagnie Française des métaux. It was served by a railway junction behind the site. Around 1950 it took the name of "Bar Lorforge". The company, which grew considerably, specialized in hot stamping of steel, brass, aluminum alloy and other light alloys. As of 2018 the plant was owned by Manoirs Industries and employed 150 people.

=== Castelsarrasin ===
The factory at Castelsarrasin, Tarn-et-Garonne, was built after the Franco-Prussian War (1870–71), and was privately owned until 1892, when it was acquired by the Paris-based Compagnie Française des Métaux. The factory was remote from the frontiers of France, so unlikely to be occupied during a war, but accessible via road and railway. The waterfall of the Saint-Jean-des-Vignes lock provided power. Until World War I the plant remained small. During the war it was transformed into an armaments factory, with the buildings extended for more than 1 kilometre (0.62 mi) between the lateral canal of the Garonne and the Bordeaux-Sète railway. The factory made cartridges and shell casings for 105 and 155 millimetres (4.1 and 6.1 in) guns.

After the end of hostilities the artillery workshop closed down, but aluminum work had taken an important role. This was due to development of cheap hydroelectric power from the Pyrenees and aluminum processing in Tarascon-sur-Ariège. The canal was abandoned as a means of transport, with most ore delivered by truck and most products also delivered by road. When World War II began the isolated location was again an advantage and the decommissioned workshop was reopened to supply the airforce and navy. During the German occupation the factory produced civilian products such as cans, agricultural machinery parts and PTT cables, but also delivered parts to the German air force. Between 17 and 23 May 1943 almost all the stocks of raw material were removed and transported under guard to Paris and on to Germany. The plant was gradually converted back to peace-time products after the war, although some military products continued to be made until 1953. During this period the equipment was modernized, using a combination of electricity and natural gas for power. About 60% of the output in 1955 was aluminum, with light alloys, cupronickel, brass and red copper accounting for the remainder. The plant was employing 1,100 workers.

=== Couëron ===
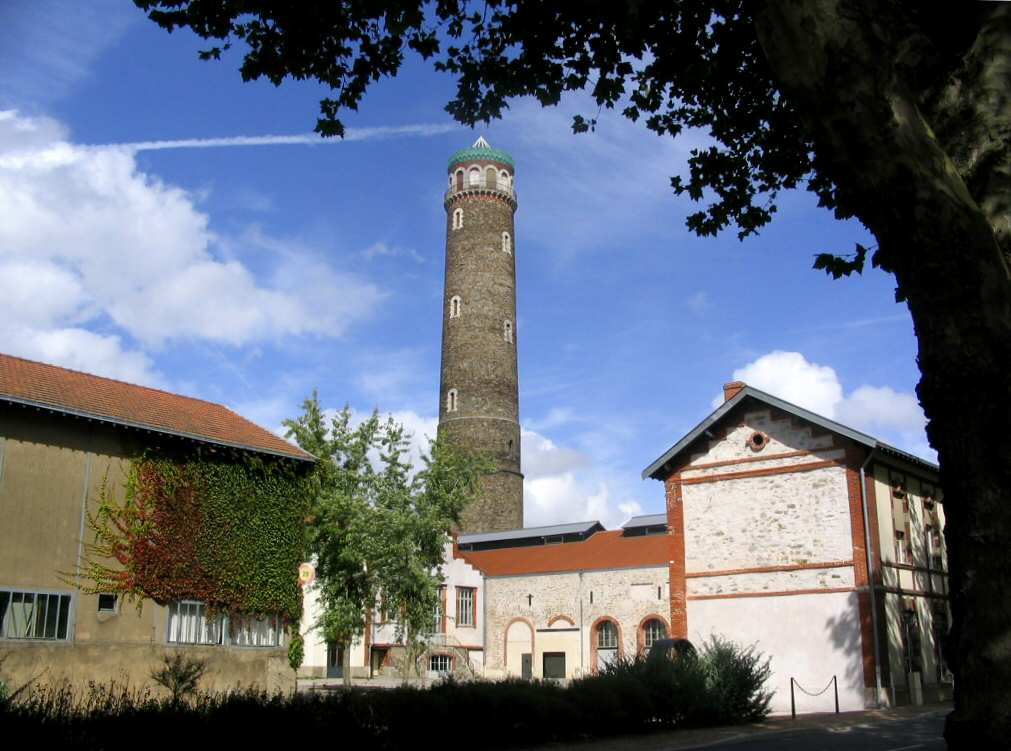
Lead tower at Couëron, used in making lead shot

In 1860 a non-ferrous metal foundry was created at Couëron. At first only lead was to be processed, but in 1878 a copper factory was added, and the company began importing refined copper and zinc. It manufactured copper locomotive boilers and electrical wire, and lead, copper and brass wires, tubes, bars and plates for sale to many other companies. On 7 July 1879 the Société des fonderies et laminoirs de Couëron merged with the Société des mines et fonderies de Pontgibaud. The Couëron facility had 350 employees in 1879, 555 in 1884 and 1,200 in 1932. In the 1950s the original lead foundry was demolished and replaced by more modern buildings. However, the company expanded the range of its products, adding aluminum to lead, copper and brass. In 1955 the factory was taken over by CFM (Compagnie française des métaux), and 101 workers were laid off. The lead tower ceased operation in 1958.

=== Déville-lès-Rouen ===
The present Compagnie des Tubes de Normandie began to produce lead linings in 1729. The Manufacture Royale de Plomb laminé had a lead mill built in Déville-lès-Rouen in 1735. The Société Laveissière bought it in 1825, and in 1881 it became part of the société Industrielle et Commerciale des Métaux. Manufacture of lead ceased around 1894. The Compagnie Française des Métaux took it over and had new buildings and worker's housing built. The plant specialized in making seamless steel tubes to meet the demand of the oil industry for transport of high-pressure fluids. It also made copper and brass products. In 1957 the Compagnie française des Métaux and the Pont-à-Mousson Sidélor group jointly formed the Compagnie des Tubes de Normandie. After a major investment the new 7 hectares (17 acres) factory restarted manufacturing in February 1959 making steel tubes from 33 to 273 millimetres (1.3 to 10.7 in) in diameter. In 1961 it became part of the Union Sidérurgique Lorraine (Sidelor). The plant was taken over by the Vallourec company around 1980.

=== Givet ===
A copper factory was created in 1806 by Gédéon de Contamine in Fromelennes, near to Givet, on the Belgian border. The factory had three rolling mills and five furnaces in the central building between two 8.5 metres (28 ft) wheels. There was a wire drawing plant in the west building. The plant specialised in rolling yellow copper for use as hull plates for boats. It was sold in 1811 to Raymond de Montagnac de Chauvence, who rented it in 1814 to Pierre Saillard. It was sold in 1830 to Jean-Baptiste Aufrère de la Treuille, and in 1835 was sold to the Estivant brothers. The company was named Estivant frères in 1868. In 1878 the surviving brother, Edouard Estivant, sold his copper factories to Pierre Eugène Secretan, who combined them with his Société Métallurgique du cuivre. At that time it employed 47 workers. This was merged in 1881 with the Laveissière group to form the Société Industrielle et Commerciale des Métaux, which was taken over in 1892 by the Compagnie Française des métaux (CFM), which gradually shut down operations at Houillette and finally closed it in 1940.

As of 2018 one of the two remaining sites of Tréfimétaux in France was the Usine de Givet, in Fromelennes, created in 1806. The facility had an area of 50 hectares (120 acres) of which 10 hectares (25 acres) were covered. It produced copper tubes for use in buildings for domestic hot and cold water systems, heating, gas, air conditioning and medical fluids, as well as copper tubes for industrial use, mainly for air conditioning and refrigeration equipment.

=== Niederbruck ===
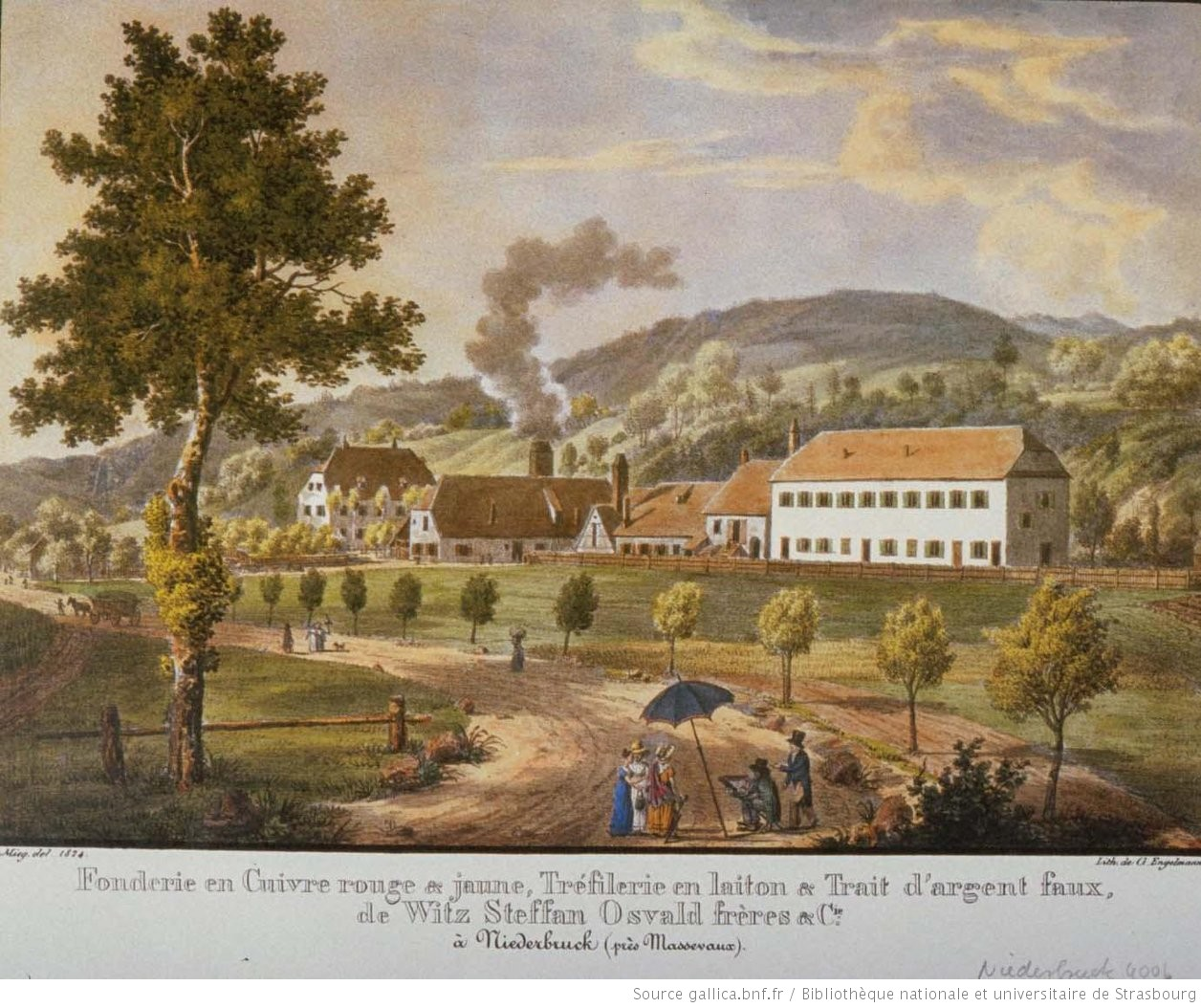
Niederbruck plant in 1824

A second Tréfimétaux facility is in the commune of Niederbruck, Haut-Rhin, near to Mulhouse. The factory dates back to 1862. The original Niederbruck copper factory was established in 1809 by Wiltz, Steffan, Oswald Frères et Cie. using local copper ore. Around 1850 it passed to the Swiss Auguste-Henri Warnod, who imported copper from around the world and employed 200 workers. Joseph Vogt and his older brother bought the Warnot and Meyer plant in Niederbruck in 1881. They already owned a foundry they had created in Masevaux around 1862 and the Héberlé & Ott foundry in Mulhouse, which they had bought in 1875. During World War I (1914–18) the French moved into the region in the first weeks, and the Masevaux foundry and Niederbruck copper works were converted to production of war materials. The French President Raymond Poincaré visited Niederbruck on 12 February 1915 make Joseph Vogt a Knight of the Legion of Honour. After World War II the company became "Cuivre et Alliages", a subsidiary of the Cie Française des Métaux. As of 2018 the plant manufactured copper bars, flat surfaces and machined and shaped products, mainly for the electrical industry.

=== Sérifontaine ===
Charles-Marie Prévost d'Arlincourt, general and baron of the empire, built the Saint-Victor factory at Sérifontaine during the July Monarchy. The site had an area of 14 hectares (35 acres). It takes its name from an old mill on the Epte that had probably been named by 12th century monks, and for many years the river supplied power to the factory. The building had unusual ogival windows, which were also found in Dangu. The copper for the Statue of Liberty was rolled at the factory. Eugène Secrétan incorporated the factory into his Société des Métaux and made important improvements. At the start of World War I it belonged to the new Compagnie Française des Métaux, a major listed company in Paris. It ran at full speed during the war supplying the army. The plant was finally closed in 2009.

== Sources ==
- A. D. (26 November 1938), "M. Georges VÉSIER (1858–1938)" (PDF), Le Génie Civil. Revue Générale des Industries Françaises et étrangères (in French) (2937)
- Burnand, Robert, ed. (1924), "VÉSIER (Georges)", Qui êtes-vous?: Annuaire des contemporains; notices biographiques (in French), Paris: C. Delagrave
- Billiard, Willy, Bar-sur-Aube photographies aériennes (in French)
- Bitsch, Marie-Thérèse (1994), La Belgique entre la France et l'Allemagne, 1905-1914, Publications de la Sorbonne, ISBN 978-2-85944-239-2
- C'était ici (in French), Saint-Denis
- Etienne Claire (12 September 1997), "Tréfilerie, laminoir, société des tréfileries et laminoirs du Havre, puis Tréfimetaux, puis Chiers-Châtillon, puis Tecnor", Base Mérimée (in French), Ministry of Culture
- Favier, Jacques (4 February 2013), "Notre usine", Sérifontaine, un patrimoine commun (in French)
- Feral, François (1955), "Un établissement industriel implanté dans une région agricole. L'usine de la Compagnie Française des Métaux à Castelsarrasin (Tarn-et-Garonne)" (PDF), Revue Géographique des Pyrénées et du Sud-Ouest (in French), 26 (1): 71–74, doi:10.3406/rgpso.1955.1403
- Fluhr, Denis (21 January 2017), "Une histoire de cuivre", DNA: Dernières Nouvelles d'Alsace (in French)
- "Georges Desbrière: " Moderniser grâce aux accords de spécialisation "" (PDF), L'Entreprise (in French) (151), 26 July 1958
- Guillet, Léon (June 1939), "Georges VÉSIER (1858-1938)" (PDF), Revue de la Métallurgie (in French) (6)
- Histoire (in French), Fromelennes, archived from the original on 2018-02-04
- "Jacques Edouard MELON (1846–1899)", Annales des Mines (in French)
- Jaeger, Gérard (2011), Portrait de Joseph Vogt, industriel fondeur, maître sondeur et créateur de KST (PDF) (in French)
- Jannet, Claudio Jannet (1892), Le capital, la spéculation et la finance au XIXe siècle (in French), Paris: E. Plon, Nourrit et Cie
- Jelidi, Charlotte (September 2007), La Fabrication D'une Ville Nouvelle Sous Le Protectorat Français Au Maroc (1912-1956) (PDF) (thesis) (in French), vol. 2, Tours
- Joly, Hervé (2008), "Diriger une grande entreprise française au XXe siècle : modes de gouvernance, trajectoires et recrutement" (PDF), Histoire (in French), Ecole des Hautes Etudes en Sciences Sociales (EHESS)
- Katz, Cécile (2003), Territoire d'usines: Seine-Saint-Denis, creaphis editions, ISBN 978-2-913610-30-9
- "Laminoir ... de la Manufacture Royale de Plomb ...", Monuments historiques et bâtiments protégés de Déville-lès-Rouen (in French)
- Le Naire, Marie-Madeleine (1955), "La métallurgie lourde dans l'estuaire de la Loire" (PDF), Norois (in French), 6 (1)
- "Les belles et sales années de plomb de l'usine Pontgibaud-Tréfimétaux", Ouest-France (in French), 24 May 2016
- L'Histoire de Tréfimétaux (in French), Tréfimétaux
- "Michel Gallerand se souvient de l'usine Pontgibaud et Tréfimétaux", Ouest-France (in French), 1 September 2014
- Pasqualaggi, Gilles (January 1952), "Les ententes en France Leurs principaux aspects Les problèmes que pose leur contrôle", Revue économique (in French), 3 (1): 63–82, doi:10.3406/reco.1952.406885, JSTOR 3497142
- "Raoul Collet", Who's Who in France (in French)
- Sites de production (in French), Tréfimétaux
- Usine de transformation des métaux dite Manufacture de cuivre Contamine, puis Estivant frères, puis Compagnie Française des métaux, actuellement maison (in French), Champagne-Ardenne, 2007, archived from the original on 2010-03-07
- Usine Tréfimétaux. Couëron, Loire-Atlantique (in French), BnF: Bibliotheque nationale de France
- "Vallourec SA", Company-Histories.com
- Vuillemin, Jean, Hippolyte Fontaine - Ch. 1848 (in French), Fondation Arts et Métiers
- Welter, Jean-Marie (2006), "Understanding the copper of the Statue of Liberty", JOM, 58 (5): 30–33, Bibcode:2006JOM....58e..30W, doi:10.1007/s11837-006-0019-7, S2CID 109831298
