= Société des mines et fonderies de Pontgibaud =

French mining and smelting company

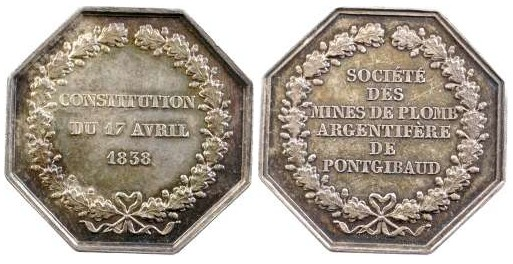
- Industry: Silver and lead mining and refining
- Founded: 1852
- Founder: Alphonse Pallu
- Fate: Defunct
- Headquarters: Paris, France

The Société des mines et fonderies de Pontgibaud (Pontgibaud Mine & Foundry Company) was a French silver and lead mining and smelting company based in Pontgibaud, Puy-de-Dôme. It mined lead-silver ore deposits that had been exploited since Roman times. Later it opened another factory in Couëron in the Loire estuary, and then closed down the Pontgibaud mines and foundry. The Pontgibaud factory in Couëron diversified into other non-ferrous metal products using imported ore. After being sold and resold it finally closed in 1988.

== Location ==
Pontgibaud is in the Massif Central on the banks of the Sioule river. The belts of ore extend for about 10 kilometres (6.2 mi) north-south parallel to the course of the Sioule on both sides of Pontgibaud. The silver galena veins are embedded in gneissic rock. The different veins of ore at Pranal, Barbecot, Roure, Les Rosiers, La Miouse and Villevieille are mainly oriented in a north–south direction. The ores are encased in migmatites from the base of the Combrailles. The deposits include diverse secondary minerals such as arsenopyrite, anglesite, baryte, bournonite, cerussite, chalcopyrite, freibergite, galena, mimetite, pyrite, pyromorphite, quartz, semseyite, sphalerite, stannite, tetrahedrite and wulfenite. Many European museum hold samples of these minerals, collected from the Pontgibaud mines by 19th century mineralogists.

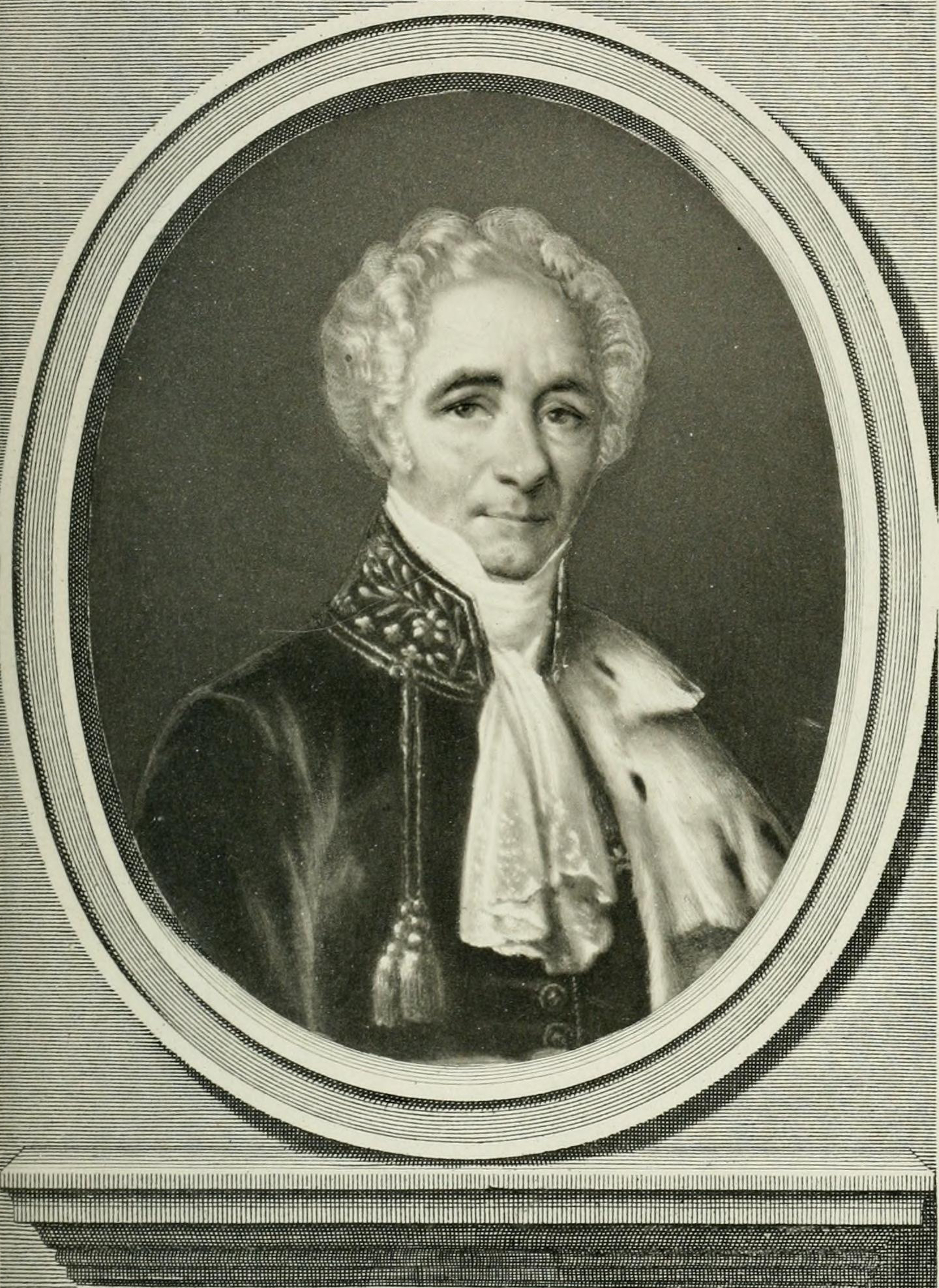
Armand-Victoire Moré de Pontgibaud (1786–1855)

== Early exploitation ==
The deposits of silver-lead ore are thought to have been worked by the Romans. Lead extracted in Roman times may have been used to cover the roof of the Temple of Mercury at the summit of Puy de Dôme, a nearby mountain. Documents from the 8th century onward attest to the mines being worked. In 1554 the lord of Pontgibaud enlarged the mining zone to extend to Roure, les Rosiers, Barbecot and les Combres. At that time mining would have been done by primitive techniques, with hand-powered machinery to hoist up the ore, crush it and sort out the mineral-rich portions.

A member of the Moré family, a musketeer of Louis XV (1710–74), bought the estate of Pontgibaud in 1756, including an ancient keep and a more modern château built in the time of Louis XIII (1601–43). He was made the Comte de Pontgibaud, taking the name "Moré de Pontgibaud". Between 1828 and 1830 Count Moré de Pontgibaud obtained concessions to open mines near his chateau. The mines were successful and soon employed 200 miners underground and 600 workers above ground. The central jury of the French Industrial Exposition of 1834 awarded the count a gold medal for his enterprise.

In 1838 Pallu et Compagnie, a société en commandite headed by Alphonse Pallu, took over the mining concession and the foundry. At that time four silver-lead mines were in operation. Although Pallu extracted significant amounts of silver and lead, the business was undercapitalized and the mines began to flood. Pallu did not have the money needed to build a 18 kilometres (11 mi) adit to drain the mines, a huge project. Pallu visited England in 1845 to study mining techniques and to look for investors. He asked the consulting firm John Taylor and Sons to undertake a study of the Pontgibaud mines. The consultant's report was favorable, but recommended a complete reorganization of the operation.

== Company formation ==
The Société des mines et fonderies de Pontgibaud was a limited company authorized by decree in 1847. It took over the concession, buildings and all other physical assets of Pallu et Compagnie. The Puy-Saint-Gulmier anthracite concession was granted to the company by decree of 7 August 1850. The company, registered as a Paris-based société anonyme, was floated in London in 1852. The four French directors were Alphonse Pallu, the Count of Pontgibaud and the Paris bankers Ernest Andre and Paul Bontoux. The four English directors were Charles Morrison, Octavius Ommanney, William Thompson (MP) and John Taylor. The directing engineers were John Taylor and Sons. The company's bankers, brokers and solicitors were all London-based.

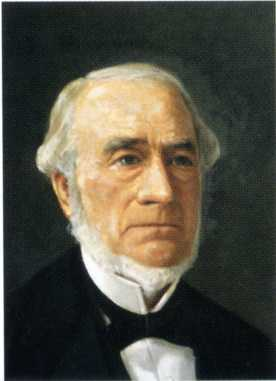
Alphonse Pallu (1808–80)

On 8 April 1853 Napoleon III issued a decree that re-authorized the Société anonyme des Mines de plomb argentifère et des Fonderies de Pontigibaud. The statutes of the society were registered by Alphonse Pallu, manager, Frédéric-Adolphe Marcuard, banker, and Paul Bontoux, proprietor. The society, with headquarters in Paris, had a term of 99 years. The property included the Barbecot, Combres, Roure and Puy-Saint-Gulmier concessions, the crushing and washing facilities at Barbecot and Rosiers, the foundries of Pontigibaud and miscellaneous machinery and buildings. 10,000 shares were issued to 76 individuals or organizations. The larger shareholders were Adolphe Marcuard & cie (2,800), Charles Morrison (1,000), William Thompson (1,000), John Taylor et Sons (1,000), Paul Bontoux (529), Octavius Ommaney (500) and D. Forbes-Cambell (500). The Count of Pontgibaud had 161 shares and Alphonse Pallu had 75 shares.

== Pontgibaud operations ==
Pontgibaud was at the center of a dozen sites extending for 10 kilometres (6.2 mi) in a north–south direction. The foundry at Pontgibaud processed ore from the nearby Pranal, Barbecot, Roure les Rosiers, La Miouse and Villevieille mines. The lead was used for crystal, plumbing, ceramics and paint, while the silver was used for coins. The mines yielded 5 kilograms (11 lb) of silver per ton of lead, and were some of the richest in Europe. In 1857 the Pontgibaud smelter produced 1,919 kilograms (4,231 lb) of silver and 562,000 kilograms (1,239,000 lb) of lead. In 1871 alone 5,255 tons of ore were extracted.

The mines employed 1,500 people, not counting related trades, and were the largest employer in the region. Miners worked 12-hour shifts and earned from 1.25 to 2 francs a day. At the time, bread cost 32 centimes. The company created an insurance and providence fund, and miners received a modest pension. At first the Sioule and its small tributaries were used to power machinery, and horse power was also used to power the hoists. Powerful Cornish-type steam pumps removed water from the 250 metres (820 ft) deep Alice and Taylor pits at Brousse and Roure. Compared to coal the lead/silver mines were relatively safe, with no gas or explosions, and few collapses. The main danger came from rising carbon dioxide.

The price of lead fell and the company faced competition from the Cévennes mines. Production began to decline after 1880 and pits were progressively closed. The foundry continued to process minerals from outside the region, then in 1897 was finally closed. In total 68 kilometres (42 mi) of galleries and 2,900 metres (9,500 ft) of shafts had been dug. 50,000 tons of lead were produced and 100 tons of pure silver. The société des mines et fonderies de Pontgibaud lost its title to the Puy-Saint-Gulmier anthracite concession by decree of 18 March 1907 due to prolonged non-exploitation. The three lead-silver mining concessions in the Pontgibaud district were renounced in 1939.

== Couëron factory ==
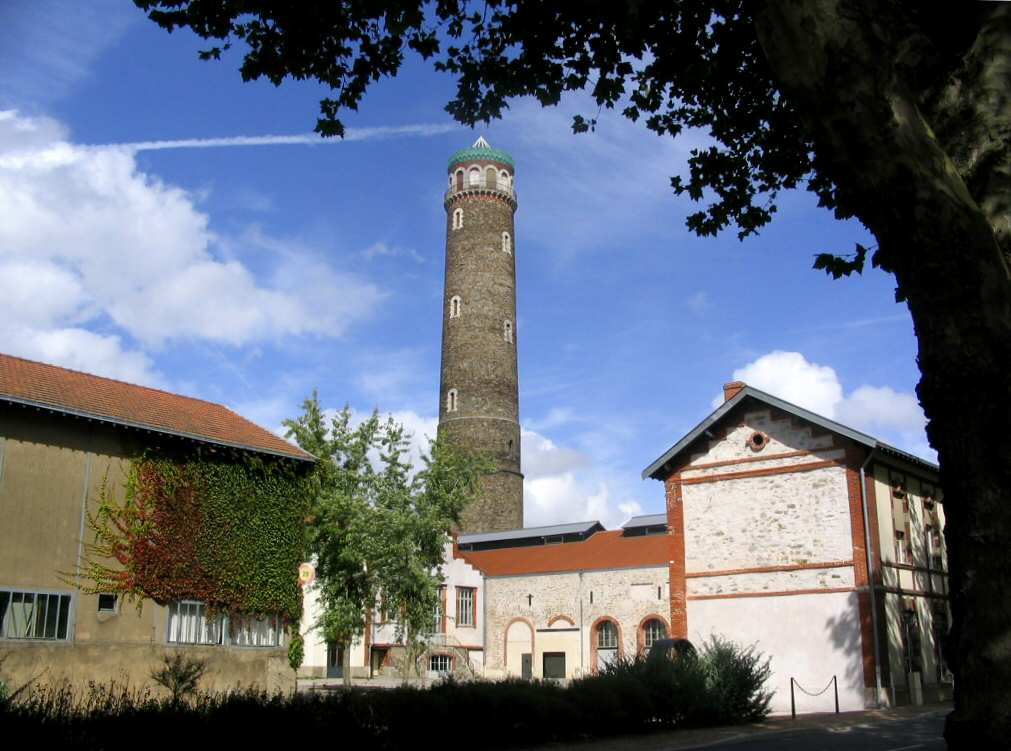
Lead tower in Couëron

The company decided to expand into processing lead ore from other parts of the world. Land was available on the tidal lower Loire to which lead ore could be brought from Sardinia and coal from Britain. The company acquired an English company with a small metallurgical plant in Nantes, and in 1860 founded a non-ferrous metal foundry at Couëron. The Couëron lead foundry employed 160 workers in 1863. At first only lead was to be processed, but in 1878 a copper factory was added, and the company began importing refined copper and zinc. It manufactured copper locomotive boilers and electrical wire, and lead, copper and brass wires, tubes, bars and plates for sale to many other companies. The new owners of the company put up several new buildings, inaugurated in 1878, including the lead tower and the big hall (now the media library). On 7 July 1879 the Société des fonderies et laminoirs de Couëron merged with the Société des mines et fonderies de Pontgibaud.

The facility had 350 employees in 1879, 555 in 1884 and 1,200 in 1932. After World War II the Couëron plant stopped refining lead ore. In the 1950s the original lead foundry was demolished and replaced by more modern buildings. However, the company expanded the range of its products, adding aluminum to lead, copper and brass. By this time the Couëron factory was the company's only property in France other than depots and commercial offices. It was the 4th largest producer of non-ferrous metal products in France, occupying a site 950 by 50 metres (3,120 by 160 ft) along the bank of the river below a cliff. It was connected to the railway and had a private dock on the river. Lead was imported from Tunisia, copper from Canada, zinc from Belgium and aluminum from southeast France.

In the early 1950s the plant was delivering about 7,200 tons per year of copper and alloy products, and 2,400 of lead products. Hunting bullets were a significant product, with the factory accounting for 10% of French production. Many of the customers were in the Nantes region, including the Nantes and Saint-Nazaire naval shipyards, Indret marine engine plant, Donge oil refineries and other industrial plants, but its products were sold throughout France. The factory employed 600 workers and 100 office staff. Up to half the workers lived in housing built by the factory, while others lived in the surrounding country. In 1955 the factory was taken over by CFM (Compagnie française des métaux), and 101 workers were laid off. The lead tower ceased operation in 1958. In 1962 the facility became owned by Tréfimétaux. New workshops were built, but the economy was struggling. The number of employees had declined to 550 in 1965 and 350 in 1975. Around 1986 the factory became Métayer-Noël. It had 160 employees in 1988, when it closed down. In 1992 the site was sold to Lambert Manufil. The lead tower was declared a historical monument in 1993.

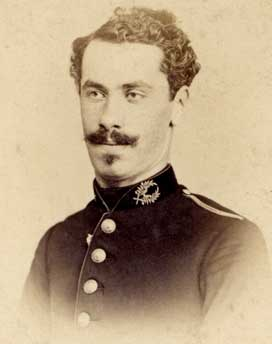
Émile Paraf (1846–1924)

== Key people ==
Émile Paraf joined the Société des forges de Châtillon-Commentry-Neuves-Maisons after the Franco-Prussian War of 1870, and also became head of the Mines et Fonderies de Pontgibaud, which prospered under his administration. He was later active in various other mining and metallurgy companies and industry organizations. Paraf was responsible for the merger of the Société des Mines et Fonderies de Pontgibaud with the Fonderies et Laminoirs de Couëron. He directed the new company until his death in 1924.

- Claude Maurice Bernard (1864–1923) joined the Corps des mines in 1884. He was first assigned to the Mines de Béziers, then to the Société des mines et fonderies de la Canette (Aude), and then became consulting engineer to the Société des mines et fonderies de Pontgibaud.
- Alphonse Dominique Robert was director of the Fonderies et laminoirs des usines de Couëron and the Société de Pontgibaud in 1879.
- Louis Dusac was director of the Mines de Pontgibaud in 1881.
- Jacques de Nervo was Vice-president of the Mines et Fonderies de Pongibaud in 1953.

== Later developments ==
Mounds of infertile yellow spoil dotted the landscape around Pontgibaud for many years after mining ended. A century after the mines were closed there remained nearly 60 traces of open and dangerous shafts and galleries, which were made safe in 2009. At Pontgibaud the largest of the three chimneys, 50 metres (160 ft) high, and a few buildings still remain. A 2.7 kilometres (1.7 mi) diversion canal from the Sioule, which powered the pumps and hoists of Barbecot and Pranal, is still visible.

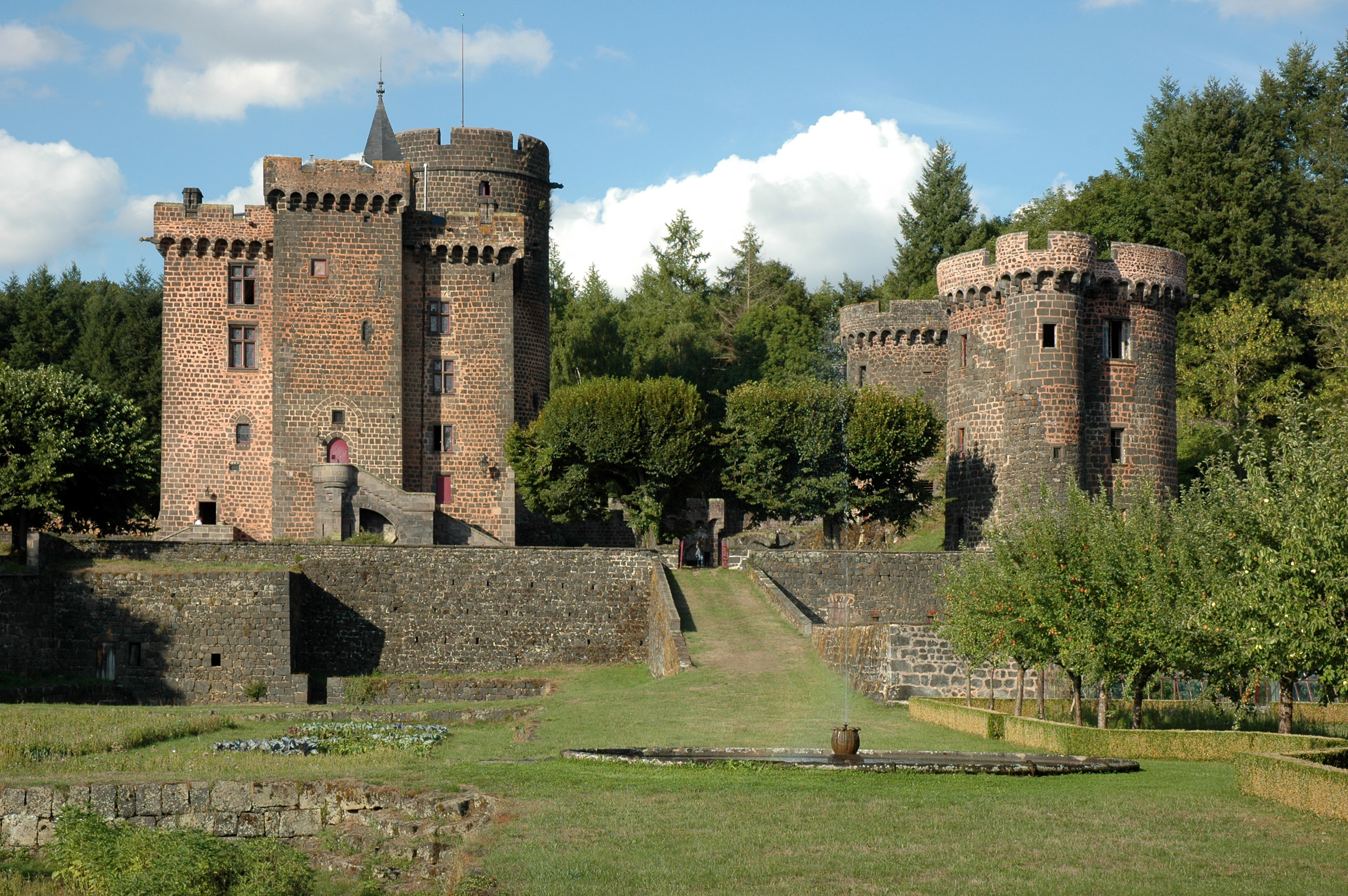
Château-Dauphin in Pontgibaud

The four sites for crushing and washing the minerals left about 300,000 cubic metres (11,000,000 cu ft) of tailings. These contain high levels of lead, arsenic, cadmium and zinc. The deposits contain no organic material, have steep slopes and have high metallic content, all of which prevent growth of vegetation. They are subject to strong erosion by water and wind, which impacts the Sioule river and the neighboring lands in a region that is now very dependent on tourism. As of 2016 work was in progress to restructure the mounds of deposits, surround them by drainage ditches and cover them with meadows. The Pontgibaud-stade and La Brousse sites were secured in 2014. Work was planned for the Roure les Rosiers site in 2016, a 15 hectares (37 acres) site with about 84,700 cubic metres (2,990,000 cu ft) of tailings, a reservoir and two streams. The residues there included dark and vitrified unprocessed material and fine, yellowish sands from the washing. The process of securing the entire district was expected to take over 10 years.

Between 1886 and 1891 César de Pontgibaud had the old donjon, which had been abandoned since the time of Louis XIII, restored by a disciple of Eugène Viollet-le-Duc. The more recent château was demolished. The restoration of the Château-Dauphin included modern features such as electricity and cold water taps on each floor. Later renovations added further comforts such as hot water and bathrooms. As of 2017 the Germiny family still lived in the Château-Dauphin in Pontgibaud. The Musée de la Mine d'argent in three rooms of the Château Dauphin covers mining history in the Sioule valley, particularly the 19th century methods of extracting the ore and processing it to make silver ingots. It displays samples of the equipment and minerals, along with explanatory panels and maps.

== Sources ==
- AUV0098: District minier de Pontgibaud et Musée de la mine (in French), Association "La route des mines Dômes-Combrailles"
- "Château-Dauphin Pontgibaud", La Passion des Chateaux (in French)
- "Claude Maurice BERNARD (1864-1923)", Annales des Mines (in French)
- "Concession de Puy St Gulmier : l' historique", Histoire des mines de la région Auvergne (in French)
- Guillet, Léon (January 1926), "ÉMILE PARAF (1846-1924 )" (PDF), Revue de la métallurgie (in French) (1)
- Kiernan, Michael T. (2016-02-11), The Engineers of Cornwall at the Mines of Pontgibaud in France, Lulu.com, ISBN 978-1-326-55341-8
- Lambert Manufil, de 1924 à aujourd'hui (in French), Lambert Manufil
- La Mine des Rosiers (PDF) (in French), Club Minéralogique de Moulins, 28 September 2014
- Le Naire, Marie-Madeleine (1955), "La métallurgie lourde dans l'estuaire de la Loire" (PDF), Norois (in French), 6 (1)
- "Les belles et sales années de plomb de l'usine Pontgibaud-Tréfimétaux", Ouest-France (in French), 24 May 2016
- "Michel Gallerand se souvient de l'usine Pontgibaud et Tréfimétaux", Ouest-France (in French), 1 September 2014
- "Musée des mines d'argent", Auvergne Centre France (in French)
- Napoleon III (September 1853), Bulletin des lois de la Republique Francaise (in French), vol. Partie Supplementaire No 18, Impr. Imperial
- "Pontgibaud (Mines et Fonderies de)", SYMOGIH.ORG (in French)
- Sabourault, P.; Niemiec, D.; Pidon, A.; Girardeau, I. (2016), "Résumé" (PDF), Le district minier de plomb-argentifère de Pontgibaud (France) : vers une résilience des anciens dépôts de résidus de traitement du minerai (in French), BRGM / DPSM
- Usine Tréfimétaux. Couëron, Loire-Atlantique (in French), BnF: Bibliotheque nationale de France
- Voilhes, Jean Pierre (2012), 100 tonnes d'argent ? (in French), BalaDômes
