= Eugène Étienne =

French politician (1844–1921)

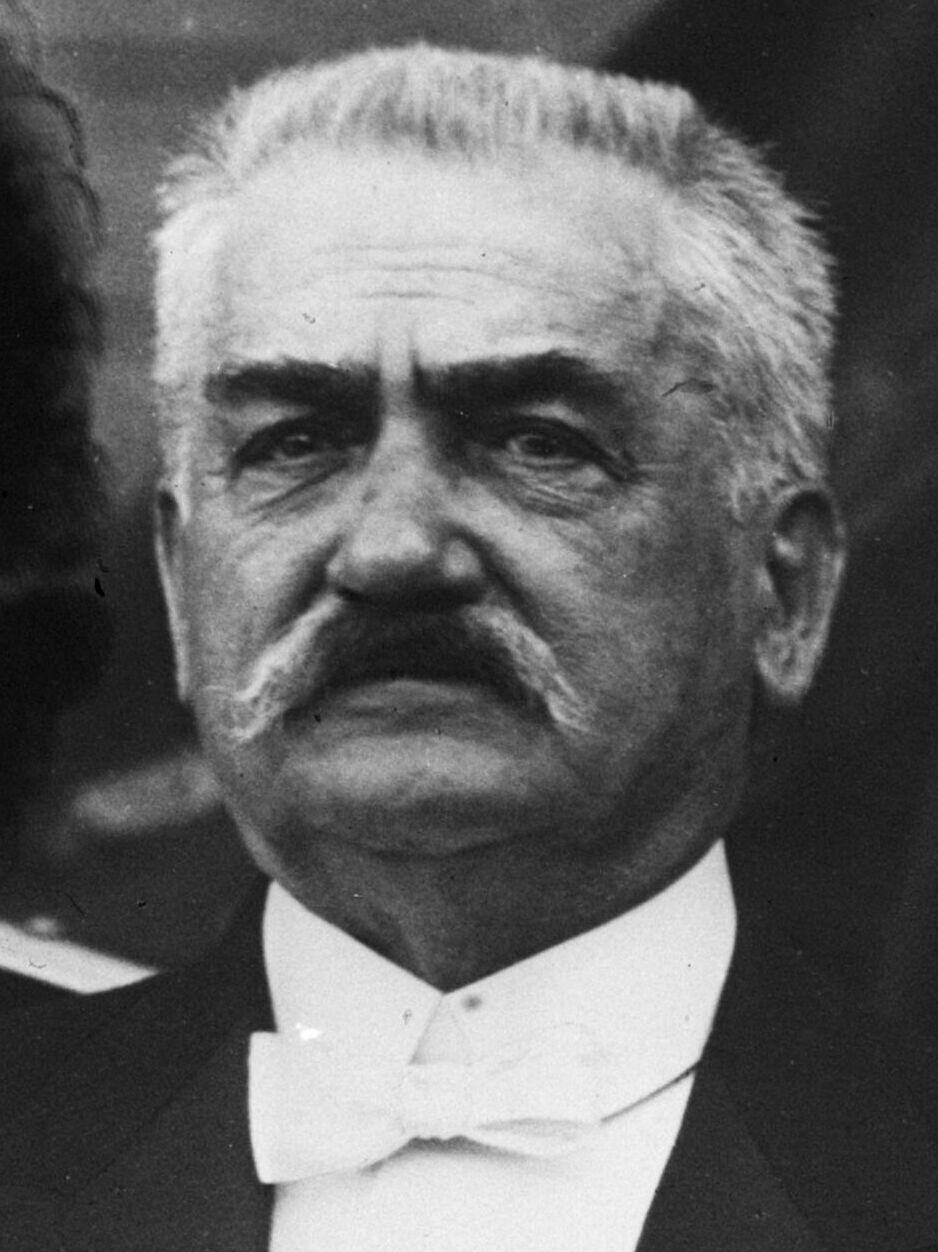
- Eugène Etienne in 1914

Personal details
- Born: 15 December 1844
- Died: 13 May 1921 (aged 76)

Eugène Etienne (French: [øʒɛn etjɛn]; 15 December 1844 – 13 May 1921) was a French politician who was a deputy from 1881 to 1919, Undersecretary of Colonies in 1887 and again from 1889 to 1892, Minister of War in 1913, and a Senator from 1920 until his death. He was known as a defender of French Algeria and a promoter of colonial expansion.

== Life ==
Etienne was born in Oran, French Algeria.

He was employed at the Messageries Maritimes and supported Gambetta in his election of 1869, even before the fall of the Second Empire. He was close to Émile Bouchet, a radical deputy. In 1878 he was appointed inspector of railways. In 1879, he founded a law firm with Émile Bouchet and Jules Blancsubé. He was a Member of the Chamber of Deputies from 1881 to 1919 and a Senator from 1920 to 1921.

Due to a combination of his upbringing in Algeria, his mentorship by Gambetta and his own business interests, Etienne would be a committed empire builder, and during this time, he would be appointed undersecretary of colonies, first in 1887, and again from 1889 to 1892. During his time in the role, he would enthusiastically support French exploration of Africa whilst working to build the resources of the undersecretariat, giving the world "the impression that from the bulge of the Niger to the Mediterranean, everything was reserved for France.". By the time he left the role, his authority and influence had to extended to the point where he had gained access to regular meetings by the cabinet, and deputies would refer to the undersecretariat as being a ministry in all but name.

He served as Minister of War from 21 January 1913 to 9 December 1913 in the governments of Aristide Briand and Louis Barthou.

Eugène Étienne presided over the Société Gambetta. He was also the leader of the colonial party, the founder and president of the Committee of Asia, the French Africa Committee and the Morocco Committee. An experienced businessman, he was also Chairman of the Board of Directors of the Compagnie Générale des Omnibus in Paris and a member of the Railway Advisory Committee.

Eugène Étienne was appointed to the board of the Tréfileries et Laminoirs du Havre (TLH) in 1911, left this position when he became Minister of War in January 1913, then rejoined the board the next year and became president until his death in 1921. He felt that the future of TLH lay in developing the railways and ports of the colonial empire. As the leader of the Colonial group in the chamber of deputies, he agitated for the expansion of railway lines in the colonies. Étienne was linked to Robert Pinot of the Comité des forges.

He was elected senator from Oran on 11 January 1920.

He is buried in the Père-Lachaise cemetery (94th Division).

== Awards ==
By a decree of 15 August 1907 Ernest Roume, the Governor General of French West Africa (AOF), named the Port of Levrier (Mauritania), "Port Etienne", today Nouadhibou .

The commune of Hennaya, currently in the wilaya of Tlemcen (Algeria), was renamed in 1922 "Eugène-Étienne". It was a colonization center created in 1851 by General Bugeaud. The municipality will keep this name until 1962 before returning to Hennaya.

A stele, installed on the Place du Petit Vichy, in the center of Oran, bears the mention "to Eugene Etienne, Oran grateful." One of the great roads of Oran was called Rue Eugene Etienne; It now bears the name of Mohamed Baghdadi; In Tlemcen, the rue Eugène Etienne became rue Commandant Djaber.

== Works ==
- Eugène Étienne, Les Compagnies de colonisation, A. Challamel, 1897

== Sources ==
- Eugène Etienne (in French), Assemblée nationale
- Joly, Hervé (April–June 2012), "Les dirigeants des grandes entreprises industrielles françaises au 20 e siècle: Des notables aux gestionnaires", Vingtième Siècle. Revue d'histoire (in French) (114, Patrons et patronat en France au 20 e siècle), Sciences Po University Press, doi:10.3917/vin.114.0016, JSTOR 23326293
- Lagana, Marc (1990), Le Parti Colonial Français: Éléments d'Histoire, PUQ, ISBN 978-2-7605-2304-3
- Magraw, Roger (1983), France, 1815–1914: The Bourgeois Century, Oxford University Press, ISBN 978-0-19-520503-9
