= Georges Vésier =

French engineer

- Born: Georges Louis Vésier; 26 October 1858; Paris
- Died: 6 November 1938 (aged 80)
- Occupations: Engineer, businessman

Georges Vésier (26 October 1858 – 6 November 1938) was a French engineer who for many years headed the Compagnie française des métaux, a major metallurgy company in France specializing in copper and aluminum products.

== Early years ==
Georges Louis Vésier was born on 26 October 1858 in Paris. Vésier's birth certificate in the Paris archives does not name his father and does not record the profession of his mother. He studied at the Lycée Condorcet. He was engaged for his military service in the artillery in 1878, leaving with the rank of sub-officer. He then studied at the École Centrale des Arts et Manufactures, where he was a brilliant pupil. He graduated as an engineer in 1882. (Note: He was in the 1882 promotion of the École Centrale. Unlike the École des Mines, for which this would mean the class that entered the school in 1882, for the École Centrale it means that class that graduated in 1882.) He married a Mlle Damour de Valbray.

Vésier was an engineer and then director at the Compagnie de Saint-Gobain, a chemical products manufacturer, from 1882 to 1889. He became a director at the Forges d'Einville from 1889 to 1891, then managing director of the Stéarinerie de l'Etoile in Saint-Denis from 1891 to 1899. In 1895 Vésier was appointed an administrator at the Compagnie française des métaux (CFM). He invented an apparatus for making superphosphates.

== President of Compagnie française des métaux ==
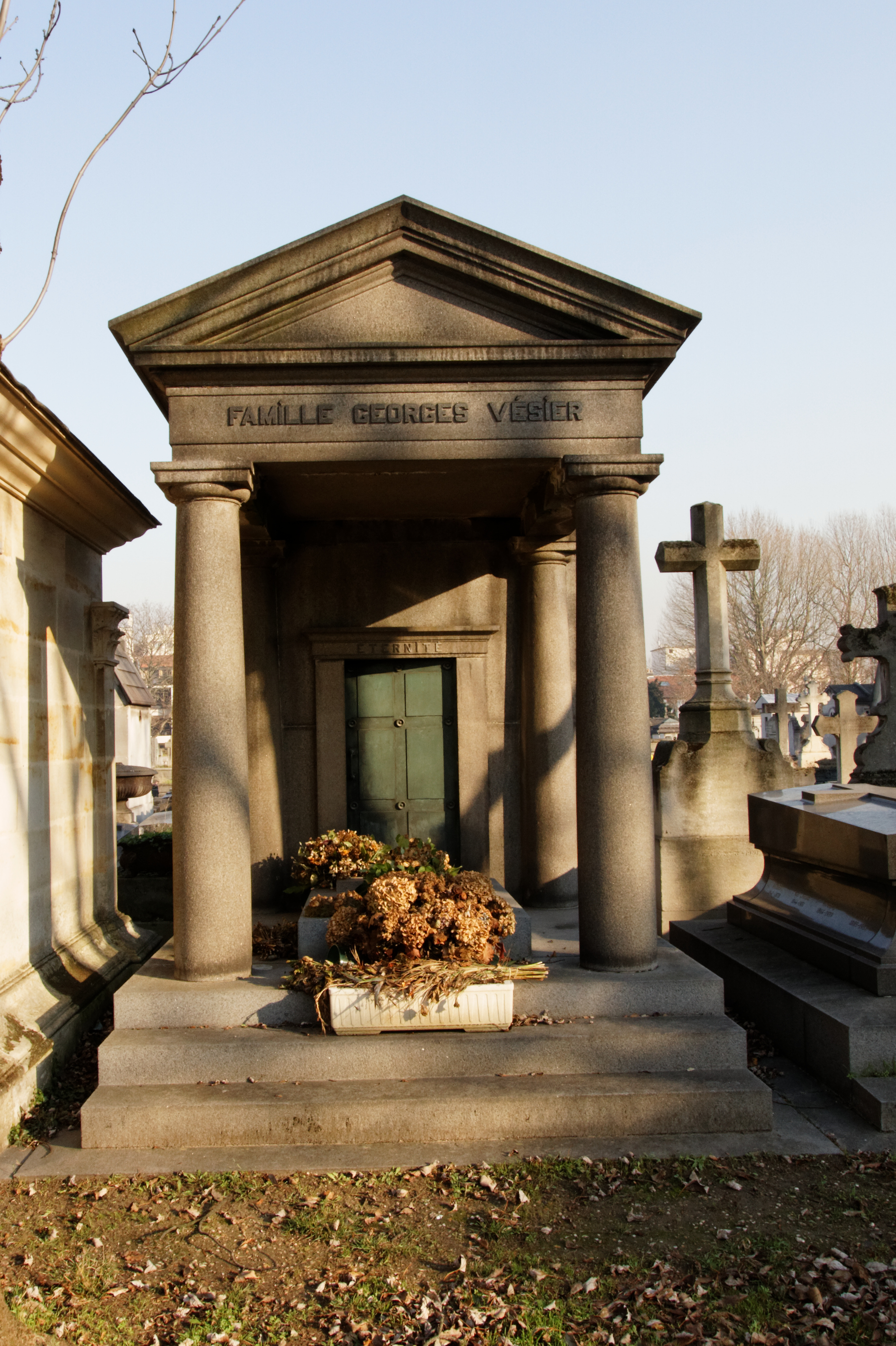
Vésier tomb in Père Lachaise Cemetery

On 2 May 1899, during a company crisis, Vésier was appointed president and managing director (administrateur délégué) at the CFM. Several directors had been dismissed due to financial setbacks. His was an example of promotion strictly on the basis of ability, which was not always the case among companies at the time. He proved to be a strong leader for this large enterprise over the next forty years. In 1899, he was appointed Vice President of the Chambre Syndicale des Métaux, and became President in 1913.

At the outbreak of World War I (1914–18) Vésier was charged by the relevant ministries with allocating important orders related to copper production for the national defense. The CFM's Ardennes factory was invaded during the war. After the war he was involved in questions of reconstruction, customs duties, agreements and social and labour issues. On 1 June 1920 Vésier, Charles Marchal of the Banque Bauer/Marchal, and the Marquis Georges de Crequi-Montfort formed a group that bought shares in the Berndorf metal factory of Arthur Krupp, which mainly worked with bronze and nickel. On 15 March 1923 the group sold the shares to the Österreichische Credit Anstalt. As of 1924 the CFM had a capital of 40 million francs.

During discussions of the Union des industries et métiers de la métallurgie (UIMM) in 1934 Vesier as representative of the large metallurgical firms was in favour of complete freedom from state interference, while Maurice Olivier on behalf of the smaller metallurgical firms thought a small degree of state intervention was indispensable. Under Vésier there was an unusual lack of graduates of the École Polytechnique at CFM, apart from his second-in-command Émile Demenge.

Vésier was president of the Chambre syndicale des Métaux, vice-president of the Group of Paris Region Metallurgical and Mechanical Industries, president or administrator of various chemical or metallurgical companies. He was on the board of the Société de Produits chimiques et électrométallurgiques, Société Alais, Froges et Camargue, and the Société Générale de Crédit Industriel et Commercial (CIC). In February 1934 Henri Thélier apologized to Vésier for recruiting him to the CIC board at a time when it was not earning money, with insufficient reserves and overvalued assets.

Georges Vésier died on 6 November 1938 following a major operation at the age of 80. At the time of his death he was a member of the steering committee of the Revue de Métallurgie, honorary president of the Chambre Syndicale des Métaux and president of the Compagnie Francaise des Métaux. After his death Georges Desbrière, Director General of the CFM, retained his post, but the managing director Émile Demenge resigned. Vésier was made a Knight of the Legion of Honour on 14 August 1900. He was promoted to Officer of the Legion of Honour on 24 November 1906. He was also a Knight of the Order of Leopold of Belgium. He was buried in the family tomb at the Père Lachaise Cemetery.

== Sources ==
- A. D. (26 November 1938), "M. Georges VÉSIER (1858–1938)" (PDF), Le Génie Civil. Revue générale des industries françaises et étrangères (in French) (2937)
- Burnand, Robert, ed. (1924), "VÉSIER (Georges)", Qui êtes-vous?: Annuaire des contemporains; notices biographiques (in French), Paris: C. Delagrave
- Fonds Rosambert et Laprévote 159 J Répertoire numérique $ (in French), Nancy: Archives départementales de la Meurthe-et-Moselle, 2012
- Fraboulet, Danièle (2007), Quand les patrons s'organisent: Stratégies et pratiques de l'UIMM 1901–1950 (in French), Presses Univ. Septentrion, ISBN 978-2-85939-994-8
- Guillet, Léon (June 1939), "Georges VÉSIER (1858-1938)" (PDF), Revue de la métallurgie (in French) (6)
- Joly, Hervé (2008), "Diriger une grande entreprise française au XXe siècle : modes de gouvernance, trajectoires et recrutement" (PDF), Histoire (in French), Ecole des Hautes Etudes en Sciences Sociales (EHESS)
- Stoskopf, Nicolas (2009), Histoire du Crédit industriel et commercial (1859-2009) (in French), Editions La Branche
- "VESIER Georges Louis", Léonore (in French), Ministry of Culture
