= Tréfileries et Laminoirs du Havre =

Enterprise based in Le Havre, France

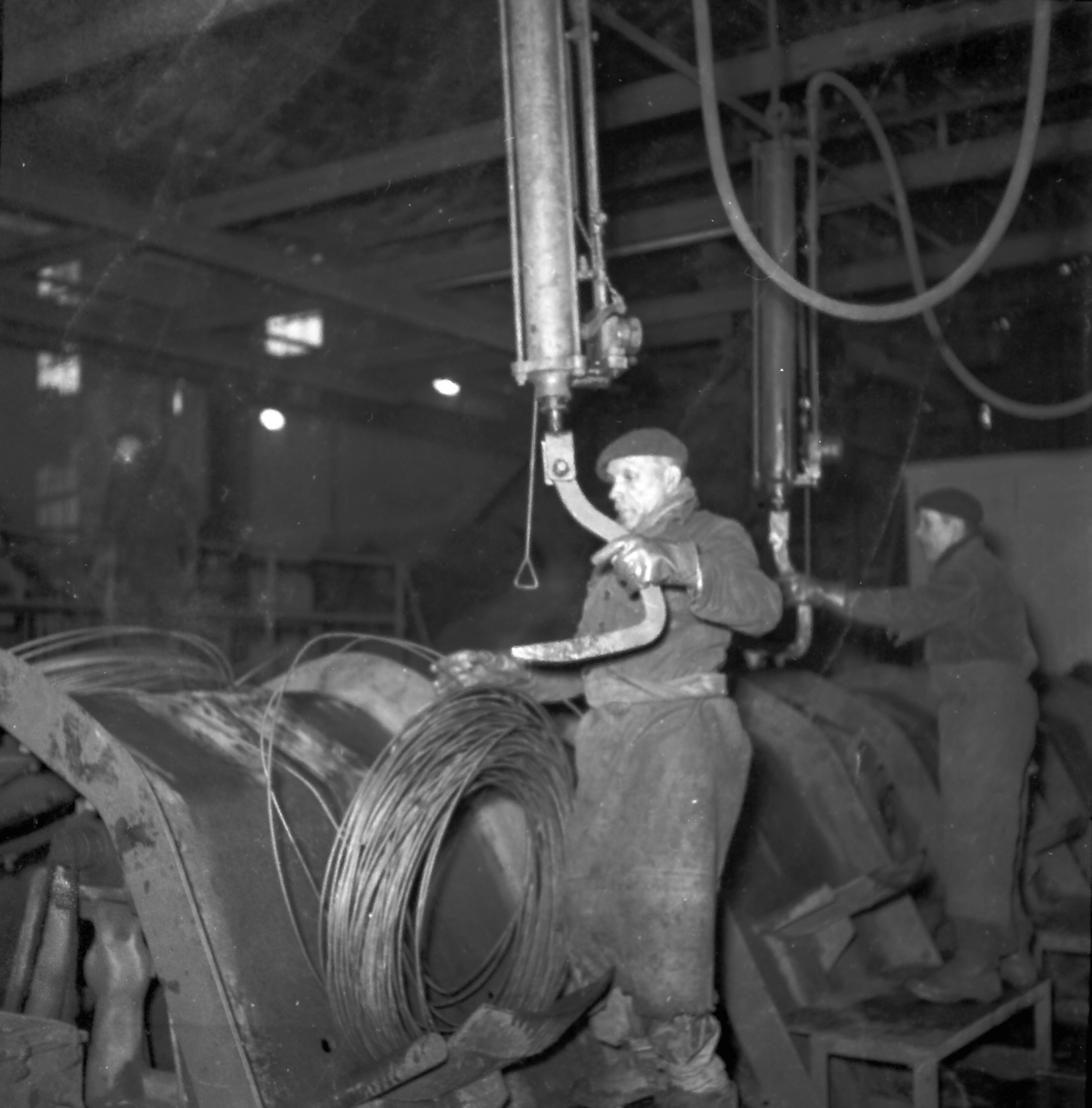
- Workers in the company's Le Havre mills after World War II
- Industry: Copper
- Founded: 7 July 1883
- Defunct: 1962
- Fate: Merged
- Successor: Tréfimétaux
- Headquarters: Paris, France

The Tréfileries et Laminoirs du Havre (TLH: Le Havre Wire-Drawing and Rolling Mills) was an enterprise based in Le Havre, France, that manufactured copper wire, other copper products and products of other metals including bronze and aluminum. It was founded to serve the rapidly growing market for electrical power transmission and for telegraph and telephone cables. It grew into a massive industrial empire with factories in many French cities and abroad. In 1962 it merged with the Compagnie française des métaux and became Tréfimétaux. In 1967 Tréfimétaux was acquired by Pechiney. The various plants were closed or sold over the years.

== Founder ==
The company was created by Lazare Weiller (1858–1928), who was born in the small town of Sélestat in Alsace on 20 July 1858. He studied in Angoulême and Paris, and then at Trinity College, Oxford. He returned to Angoulême to work in his cousin's factory, which produced metal sheets for the paper industry. He became interested in the problem of drawing copper wires, for which there was growing demand, adapted the process of rolling hot steel rods into wire so the method could be used with copper and launched his own company in Angoulême to make copper wire in this way. He developed a bronze alloy that combined the conductivity of copper with the strength to remain stretched between poles 50 metres (160 ft) apart, of great value to telegraph and telephone companies, and obtained several patents in France and other countries.

In 1880 at the age of 22 Weiller created what would become the Tréfileries et Laminoirs du Havre. Weiller joined the board of the Société des téléphones, which was both a customer and an investor in his company. Weiller remained interested in research and explored transmission of images over electrical wires, colour photography and flying. He was elected a deputy in 1914, and held office through World War I, then was a senator from 1920 until his death in 1928.

== Early years ==
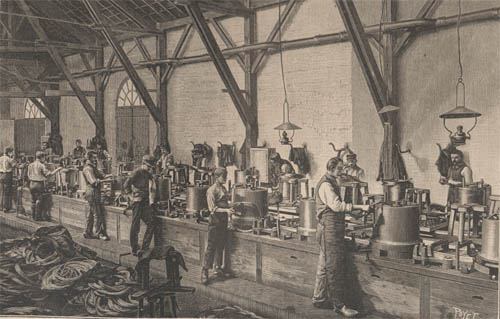
Atelier de tréfilerie Lazare Weiller 1892

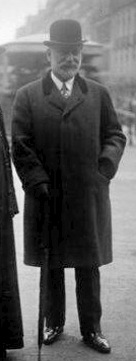
Lazare Weiller in 1920

Weiller created the Société Lazare Weiller in 1883, with the first factory in Angoulême, and was the main owner of the enterprise. The company was incorporated on 7 July 1883. Weiller acquired land along the Paris–Le Havre railway and the new Canal de Tancarville in 1895, and in 1896 built a larger factory at Graville^{(fr)} in the Le Havre region. The choice of location was to take advantage of Le Havre as a port of entry for copper and a port from which to export products to England and the United States. In 1898 the Le Havre factory had 14 steam engines with 8,300 horsepower and 114 electric machines. The factory avoided employing great numbers of workers, but in 1897 had 900 employees, rising to almost 2,000 in 1913. It covered about 20 hectares (49 acres) of which half was roofed. It included forges, foundries, rolling mills and wireworks and processed copper, steel, aluminum, brass, bronze and nickel. The bulk of the output was for electrical equipment and construction of telephone and telegraph lines.

In 1901 the company became the Compagnie des Tréfileries et Laminoirs du Havre (TLH). Weiller became associated with Swiss banks, and from 1907 started to acquire facilities and companies to become a huge industrial complex. The company, now a société anonyme, increased its market share through the purchase of the Société coopérative des fonderies, laminoirs et tréfileries de Rugles in 1907. In 1911 TLH further increased its production of electrical wires and cables by merging with the Canalisation électrique company, giving it a dominant position in the industry, reducing competition and opening new markets in Paris streetcars, the PTT and other ministries, railways and so on.

Eugène Étienne was appointed to the TLH board in 1911, left this position when he became Minister of War in January 1913, then rejoined the board the next year and became president until his death in 1921. Étienne was a member of the Chamber of Deputies from 1881 to 1919. He was leader of the Colonial group in the chamber of deputies, and agitated for expansion of railway lines in the colonies. He felt that the future of TLH lay in developing the railways and ports of the colonial empire. Etienne was linked to Robert Pinot of the Comité des forges.

In 1913 the company's assets were 57,800,000 francs, making it the 22nd largest industrial company in France, and the third largest manufacturer of electrical equipment after the Compagnie Francaise Thomson-Houston and Compagnie Générale d'Electricité. Members of the board of TLH were also involved in many other companies, helping the growth of the enterprise. Examples were Henri Cahen, director of the Société des applications industrielles; Alphonse Hauser, retired chief engineer of the navy and administrator of the Compagnie des ports de Tunis, Sousse et Sfax; Raymond Jarry, administrator of the Société des hauts fourneaux de la Chiers; Gaston de La Mathe, administrator of the Société Éclairage électrique and Société Énergie du nord de la France; and René Robard, an engineer also on the board of Alluminio italiano. Hippolyte Bouchayer, Émile Cahen, Henri Cahen, Raymond Jarry and René Robard were all members of the board of TLH and of its Italian subsidiary Le Trafilerie e laminatoi di metalli, which produced copper wire and steel and copper pipe for the Italian market, particularly the Italian armed forces.

== World War I ==
During World War I, of 2,700 employees at Le Havre, 2,200 were enlisted in the army; the factory was placed under military control and engaged in production of war material. Women and children were employed in large numbers, as were refugees from Belgium and the occupied parts of France. The number of workers rose to 6,800 at Le Havre and 1,300 at Rugles. In the spring of 1917 five workers were dismissed for circulating a petition that objected to downgrading the classification of some jobs and demanded a cost of living allowance. During this period Louis Loucheur, administrator of TLH, became Minister of Armaments.

The company bought several cargo ships, which were armed in Bordeaux. In the summer of 1914 TLH took control of the Société française de couleurs métalliques et de l'aluminium laminé. TLH tried but failed to acquire the Société électrométallurgique française de Froges, the largest French producer of aluminum. TLH did manage to acquire a large stake in the Société d'Alais et de la Camargue, an aluminum producer. This company in turn took control of the Société électrométallurgique de Froges in 1919 to become the Compagnie des produits chimiques et électrométallurgiques d'Alais, Froges et Camargue (Pechiney). Hippolyte Bouchayer represented TLH in Pechiney. Although TLH did not gained as large a share of aluminum as they wanted in France, the company expanded its interests in this metal in Norway and Italy.

== Later history ==
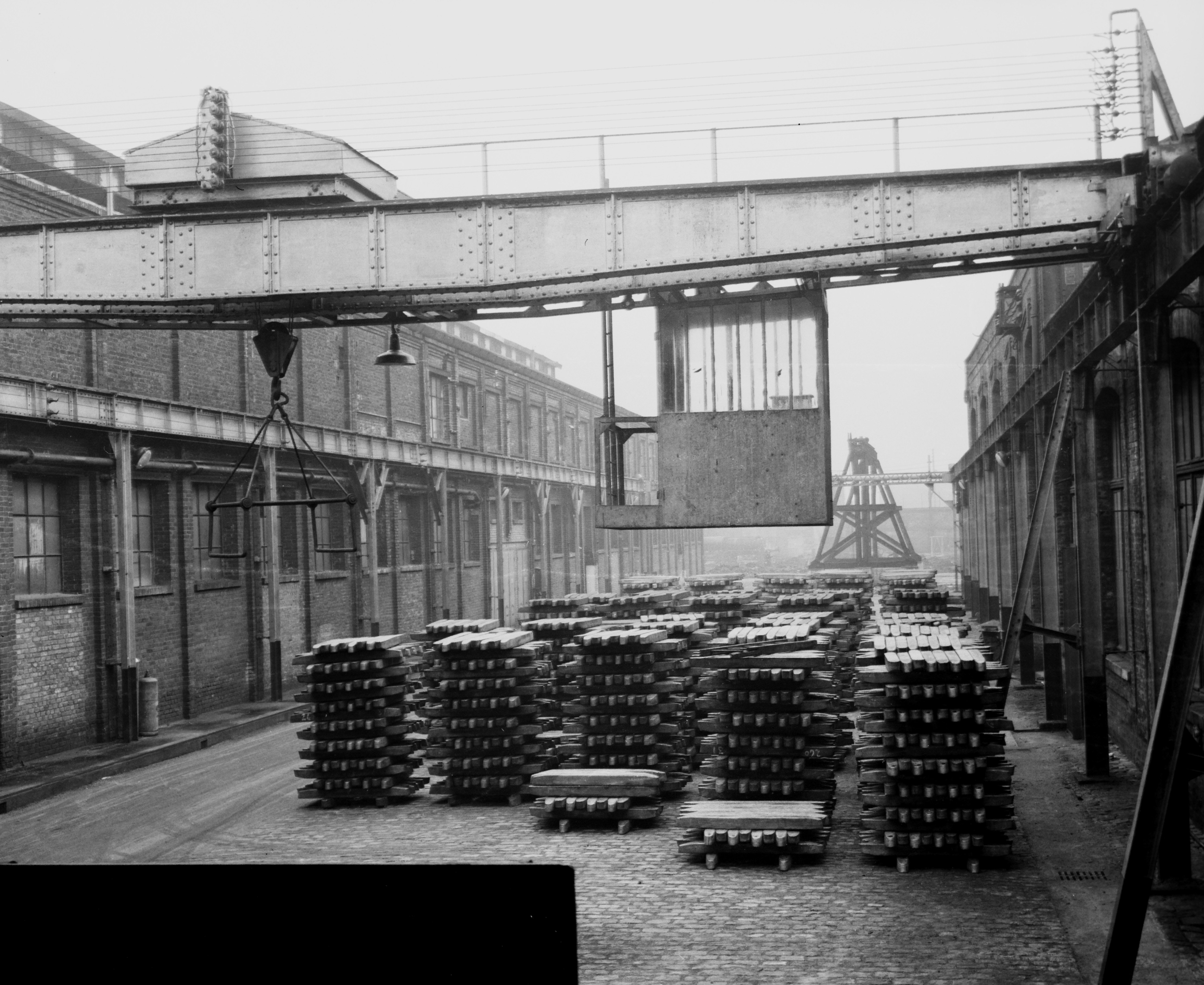
The plant in La Havre after World War II

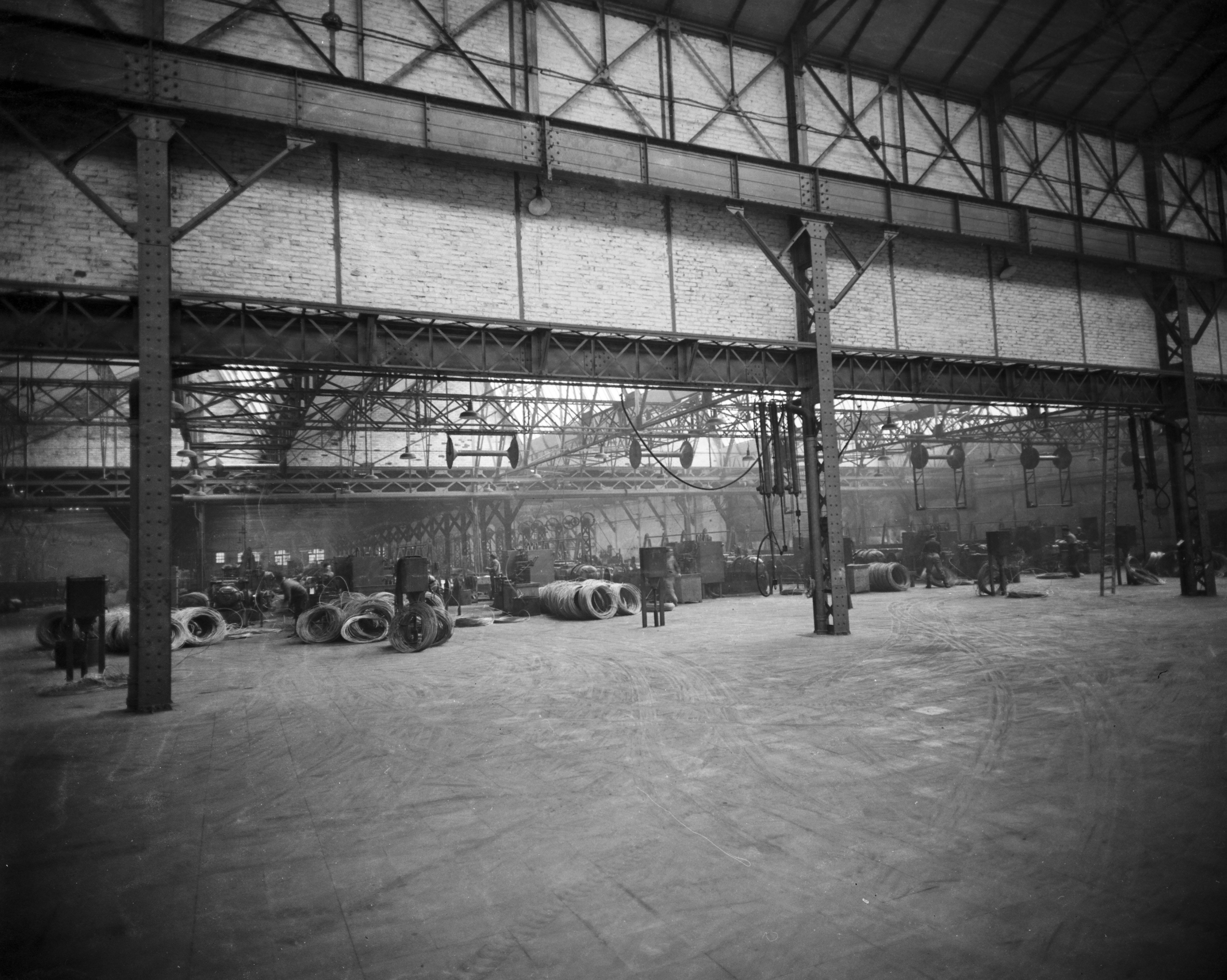
Another view of the post-war plant

The company later moved its headquarters to Paris and came to have factories in Le Havre, Rugles, Saint-Maurice, Grenoble, Charleval, la Praz, Dijon, Montreuil-Belfroy, Darnétal, Saint-Denis, La Courneuve, Poissy and Pont-de-Chéruy.

Eugène Mauclère (1857–1933), former controller-general of the army and councilor of state, a member of the board of the Chemins de fer de Paris à Lyon et à la Méditerranée and vice-president of the Mokta-el-Hadid and Phosphates de Gafsa mining companies, joined the board of TLH as president in 1931. In 1932 TLH was the largest manufacturers of copper, lead, zinc, tin and metal products in Le Havre, which now received 60% of copper imports into France thanks to its connections with North America. The plant made wire, tubes and sheets of copper and steel which were then shipped to the mechanical construction and electrical industries. A quarter of output went to the colonies.

As of 1939 TLH employed 4.673 workers in Le Havre. During World War II (1939–45) in the period between 1940 and 1944 TLH had to deal with a shortage of copper, and made more use of aluminum and aluminum alloys. From 1943 Henri Lafond was President of the Mines du Huaron and on the board of Tréfileries et Laminoirs du Havre. A 1952 study said Trefileries et Laminoirs du Havre had a capital of 3,132 million francs and holdings in Hauts Fourneaux de la Chiers, Alais-Froges, Financiere Metallurgique Electrique, Lignes Telegraphiques et Telephoniques, Etablissements Bouchery, Signaux et Entreprises Electriques, Etablissements Coquillard and the Societe Procol. TLH was also part-owner of Pechiney.

== Merger and subsequent changes ==
In 1962 TLH merged with the Compagnie française des métaux and became Tréfimétaux. In 1966 the wire drawing and steel cabling operations of Plant 2 were taken over by the Société des hauts fourneaux de Chiers-Châtillon, which opened a casting and rolling mill to manufacture small aluminum alloy cables in 1968. In 1969 Chiers-Châtillon merged with Cousin frères to form the Société Seine et Lys, which closed in 1972, laying off 425 people. Many of those who lost their jobs were women.

In 1967 Tréfimétaux was acquired by Pechiney and became the copper division of that group, contributing 8% of the group's total. In 1971 Pechiney merged with Ugine Kuhlmann to form Pechiney Ugine Kuhlman (PUK). From 1974 PUK suffered serious losses. The threat of mass dismissals was first aired in 1974. Between 1980 and 1987 the Tréfimétaux subsidiary reduced staff from 6,000 to 2,500 and closed the factories in Le Havre and Dives sur Mer. In 1980 it sold its cable production activities to Pirelli.

The Tréfimétaux copper mill in Le Havre closed in 1980, and in 1981 Tréfimétaux closed its remaining operations in Le Havre. It was succeeded by three companies: Cuivres et Alliages; Chiers, Châtillon Gorcy (which later became Hauts Fourneaux de la Chiers and then Technor); and Thomson Cables. Cuivres et Alliages was closed in 1984. In 1986 Tecnor, manufacturing wire cables and conductors, took an area of 158,000 square metres (1,700,000 sq ft) of the La Havre factories, of which 74,000 square metres (800,000 sq ft) were covered, with a line of casting, continuous rolling and wire drawing machines. Technor ceased operations in 1989–90. In January 2003 Tréfileries et Câbleries du Havre had 72 employees, falling to about 30 in April 2003.

== Key people ==
Key people included:

- Maurice Waldmann, Director of the Angoulême wire-drawing plant and then at Le Havre Director of the Cie Lazare Weiller, which became the Tréfileries et Laminoirs du Havre, 1893–1922
- Claudius Feyeux, Chief Maintenance Engineer at Le Havre Wire Drawing and Rolling Mill 1898
- Albert Lefebvre, Engineer at Le Havre Wire Works and Rolling Mills 1913–1919
- Maurice Boutin
  - Director of the Darnétal plant of the Le Havre drawing and rolling mill company 1924
  - Director of the Pont-de-Chéruy factories of the Le Havre Wire Drawing and Rolling Mill Company 1933
  - Technical Director of the Le Havre Wire Drawing and Rolling Mill Company 1945
  - Director of the Le Havre Drawing and Rolling Mill Company 1953

== Sources ==
- Amphoux, Marcel (15 January 1932), "Les Industries du Havre", Annales de Géographie (in French), 41 (229), Armand Colin: 32–48, doi:10.3406/geo.1932.11066, JSTOR 23864897
- Barzman, John (July 1995), "« LA GRAVITÉ DU FLÉCHISSEMENT QUI S'ÉTAIT PRODUIT AU HAVRE... » GRÈVES ET OPPOSITION A LA GUERRE EN 1917–1918", Guerres Mondiales et Conflits Contemporains (in French) (179), Presses Universitaires de France: 115–130, JSTOR 25732262
- Etienne Claire (12 September 1997), "Tréfilerie, laminoir, société des tréfileries et laminoirs du Havre, puis Tréfimetaux, puis Chiers-Châtillon, puis Tecnor", Base Mérimée (in French), Ministry of Culture
- Eugène Etienne (in French), Assemblée nationale
- Goncalves, Arielle (5 August 2010), "CHRONOLOGIE Pechiney, l'histoire mouvementée d'un ex-champion national", Les Echos (in French)
- Hours, Bernard (ed.), "TLH (Tréfileries et laminoirs du Havre)", SYMOGIH.ORG (in French), Laboratoire de recherche historique Rhône-Alpes (LARHRA)
- Joly, Hervé (April–June 2012), "Les dirigeants des grandes entreprises industrielles françaises au 20 e siècle: Des notables aux gestionnaires", Vingtième Siècle. Revue d'histoire (in French) (114, Patrons et patronat en France au 20 e siècle), Sciences Po University Press, doi:10.3917/vin.114.0016, JSTOR 23326293
- Lagana, Marc (1990), Le Parti Colonial Français: Éléments d'Histoire, PUQ, ISBN 978-2-7605-2304-3
- Lange, A. (6 March 2003), "Lazare Weiller (1858-1928), Meteore de l'histoire de la television", Histoire de la télévision (in French)
- Lanthier, Pierre (Autumn 1992), "LA CONSTRUCTION ÉLECTRIQUE FRANÇAISE ENTRE VICHY ET L'OCCUPATION (1940–1944)", Histoire, Économie et Société (in French), 11 (3: STRATEGIES INDUSTRIELLES SOUS L'OCCUPATION), Armand Colin: 445–453, doi:10.3406/hes.1992.1643, JSTOR 23611252
- "L'Histoire de Tréfimétaux", Tréfimétaux (in French)
- Magraw, Roger (1983), France, 1815–1914: The Bourgeois Century, Oxford University Press, ISBN 978-0-19-520503-9
- Mahl, R., "Henri LAFOND (1894–1963)", Annales des Mines (in French)
- Malon, Claude (2012), Occupation, épuration, reconstruction: Le monde de l'entreprise au Havre (1940–1950) (in French), Publication Univ Rouen Havre, ISBN 978-2-87775-554-2
- Pasqualaggi, Gilles (January 1952), "Les ententes en France Leurs principaux aspects Les problèmes que pose leur contrôle", Revue économique (in French), 3 (1), Sciences Po University Press: 63–82, doi:10.2307/3497142, JSTOR 3497142
- Perrot, Albert (2005), "Le déclin dramatique des TRÉFILERIES et LAMINOIRS du HAVRE !", Le Havre, une ville qui sent l'usine et qui sent la mer et qui sent aussi la lutte (in French), Le fil rouge
- Smith, Michael S. (Spring 1998), "Putting France in the Chandlerian Framework: France's 100 Largest Industrial Firms in 1913", The Business History Review (in French), 72 (1), The President and Fellows of Harvard College: 46–85, doi:10.2307/3116595, JSTOR 3116595, S2CID 154027899
- Zelek, Richard; Defortsecu, Jacques (Autumn 2012), "Histoire de l'entreprise Tréfileries et Laminoirs du Havre et de ses salariés" (PDF), Le Fil Rouge (in French) (45), CGT Institut d'histoire sociale
