= Jacques-Louis Battmann =

French organist and composer

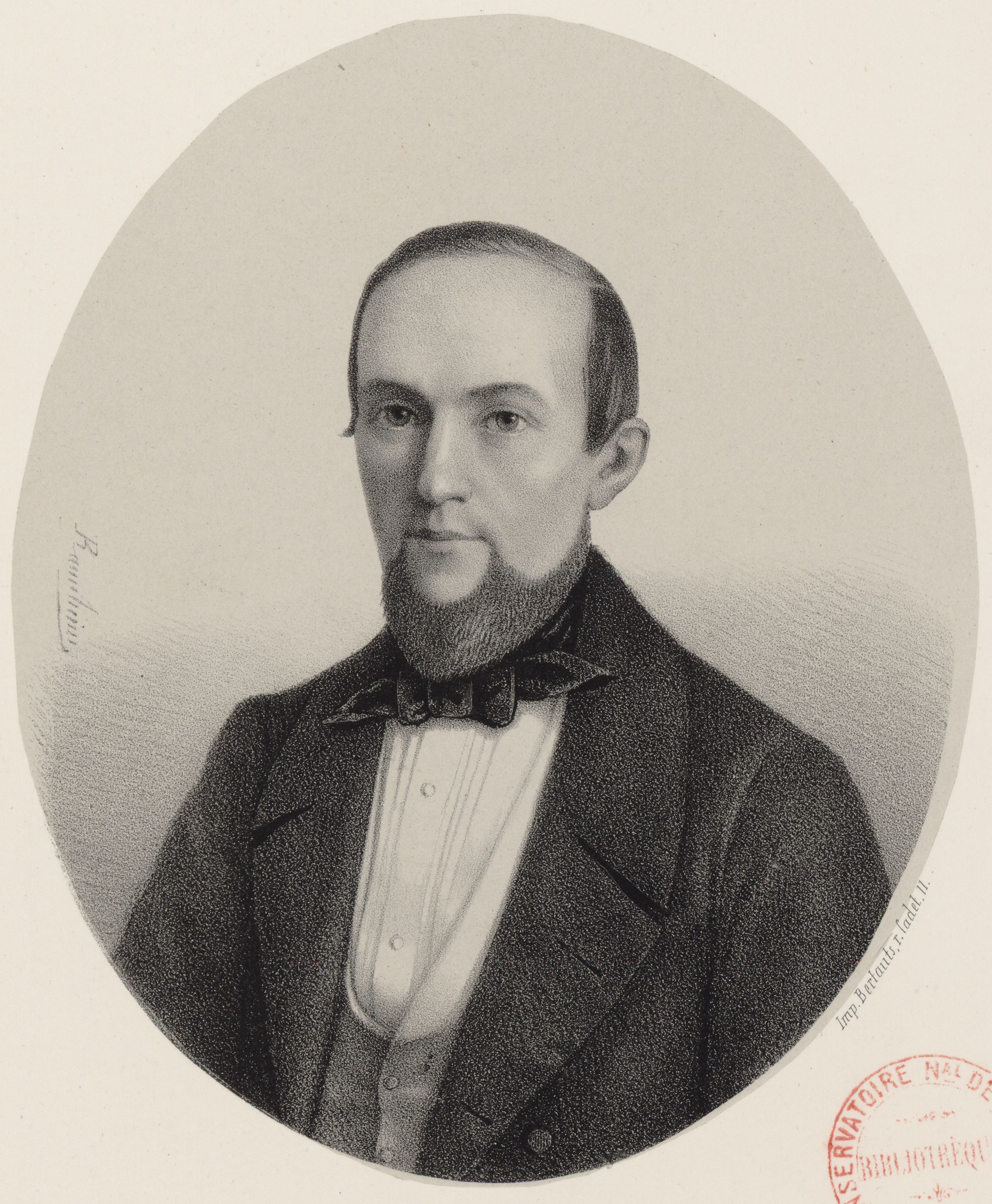
- Portrait by Hermann Raunheim (1850)
- Born: 25 August 1818; Masevaux, France
- Died: 7 July 1886 (aged 67); Dijon
- Occupations: Classical organist; Composer

Jacques-Louis Battmann (25 August 1818 – 7 July 1886) was a 19th-century French organist and composer.

== Life ==
Born in Masevaux, Battmann was around 1840 organist in Belfort, later in Vesoul and Dijon, where he also died. He published a total of 456 works, mainly in the field of Organ and piano music as well as sacred and secular choral works.

== Selected works ==
=== For pipe organ/harmonium ===
- Pieces d'Orgue: Entrée, Offertoire, Élévation, Communion, Sortie Opus 30, for organ
- 72 Morceaux pour Orgue ou Harmonium, Opus 60
- Les Immortelles opus 440, for organ or harmonium
- Le plain chant romain harmonisé Opus 250

=== For choir ===
- Messe No. 1 in F major, for two equal voices with organ or harmonium., Opus 143 (New edition Kleinmachnow 2014)
- Messe No. 2 in C major, Opus 282
- Messe No. 3 in E♭ major, for two equal voices with organ or harmonium, Opus 366
- Petite messe solennelle in C major, Opus 335
- Messe d’une très facile Exécution for solo and choir in unison with organ or harmonium, Opus 63

== Bibliography ==
- René Muller, "Jacques Louis Battmann", in Nouveau dictionnaire de biographie alsacienne, vol. 2, (p. 127)
