= Pechiney =

French aluminium conglomerate

- Industry: Aluminium
- Founded: 1855
- Founder: Henri Merle
- Fate: Acquired by Alcan in 2003
- Headquarters: Paris, France

Pechiney SA, formerly Compagnie des Produits Chimiques Henri Merle and then Société des Produits Chimiques d'Alais et de la Camargue, was a major aluminium conglomerate based in France. The company was acquired in 2003 by the Alcan Corporation, headquartered in Canada. In 2007, Alcan itself was taken over by mining giant Rio Tinto Alcan.

Prior to its acquisition, Pechiney grew to be the world's 4th largest producer and developer of aluminium products, employing 34,000 people and operating 320 manufacturing and sales facilities in 50 countries at the time it was purchased by Alcan. The group operated in all facets of the aluminium industry from bauxite mining to the development of sophisticated applications of metal products in addition to international commodities trading and brokerage of the metal on the London Metal Exchange (LME).

== History ==
The company was founded in 1855 by Henri Merle as a producer of caustic soda at a manufacturing facility in Salindres. Founded as Compagnie des Produits Chimiques Henri Merle the company was renamed in 1897 the Société des Produits Chimiques d'Alais et de la Camargue.

The company first began producing aluminium metal in 1860 using a chemically-based process developed by Henri Sainte-Claire Deville in 1854 and was granted a 30-year monopoly by the French government.

During World War I (1914–18) Tréfileries et Laminoirs du Havre (TLH) acquired a large stake in the Société d'Alais et de la Camargue. This company in turn took control of the Société électrométallurgique de Froges in 1919 to become the Compagnie des produits chimiques et électrométallurgiques d'Alais, Froges et Camargue. Hippolyte Bouchayer represented TLH in Pechiney.

Pechiney had developed a significant presence in Europe in the 1930s and first prospected the American market in 1911 before acquiring a strong foothold there in the 1960s. In the 1954, Pechiney expanded into Africa and subsequently it developed a presence in Australia, Latin America, Greece, and Asia.

The corporate name was changed to Pechiney in 1948, after a former influential managing director referred to by the same name, Alfred Rangod Pechiney.

In 1962 TLH merged with the Compagnie française des métaux and became Tréfimétaux. In 1967 Tréfimétaux was acquired by Pechiney and became the copper division of that group, contributing 8% of the group's total.

Pechiney gained worldwide recognition for its use of electrolysis technology, and was a leader in specialty packaging and aerospace applications.

=== Australia ===
In 1962, Pechiney purchased GOMINCO (Gove Mining and Industrial Corporation), formerly Gove Bauxite Corporation and a subsidiary of Australian company Duval Pty Ltd, which had interests in bauxite mining on the Gove Peninsula in Arnhem Land, in the Northern Territory of Australia. In 1963 Pechiney was persuaded to abandon Gove (where the Yolngu had raised the issue of consultation, as the traditional owners of the land, via the Yirrkala bark petitions) and join a consortium of other companies which were looking to mine bauxite at Weipa, Queensland, and produce aluminium at nearby Gladstone. Gominco was acquired by the Australian Government, and Pechiney bought a 20% stake in Queensland Alumina Limited (QAL). The company regretted this decision during the following decades, when they got very little out of the QAL project. A commercial and legal battle was only resolved in 1993, when the financing formula was eventually changed. Pechiney in the meantime looked at other Australian projects, including acquiring a 20% share in a project at Aurukun on the Cape York Peninsula, for which Aurukun Associates was created, with the other partners, Billiton and Tipperary, owning 40% each, but nothing came of that either. according to René Lesclous, "from 1960 to 1970, Pechiney missed its entrance in Australia. It did not even attempt to recover its Gove concession. The agreements with Comalco that covered Pechiney's requirements for many years were bad ones. They anaesthetised Pechiney and harmed its credibility for a long time".

=== Brandeis Brokers ===
Brandeis (Brokers) Ltd was a broker and ring dealing member on the London Metal Exchange that operated as a subsidiary of Pechiney from 1981 through 2000, when it was banned from trading by the FSA. Brandeis was one of the founding members of the London Metal Exchange in 1877. In 2000, the company's customer accounts and trading positions were purchased by Standard Bank London.

== See also ==
- Alcan
- History of aluminium

== Sources ==
- Hours, Bernard (ed.), "TLH (Tréfileries et laminoirs du Havre)", SYMOGIH.ORG (in French), Laboratoire de recherche historique Rhône-Alpes (LARHRA)
- Lagana, Marc (1990), Le Parti Colonial Français: Éléments d'Histoire, PUQ, ISBN 978-2-7605-2304-3
- L'Histoire de Tréfimétaux (in French), Tréfimétaux, archived from the original on 30 January 2018
