= Château-Dauphin =

Medieval castle in Pontgibaud in the Puy-de-Dôme département of France

Coordinates: 45°50′02″N 2°51′17″E

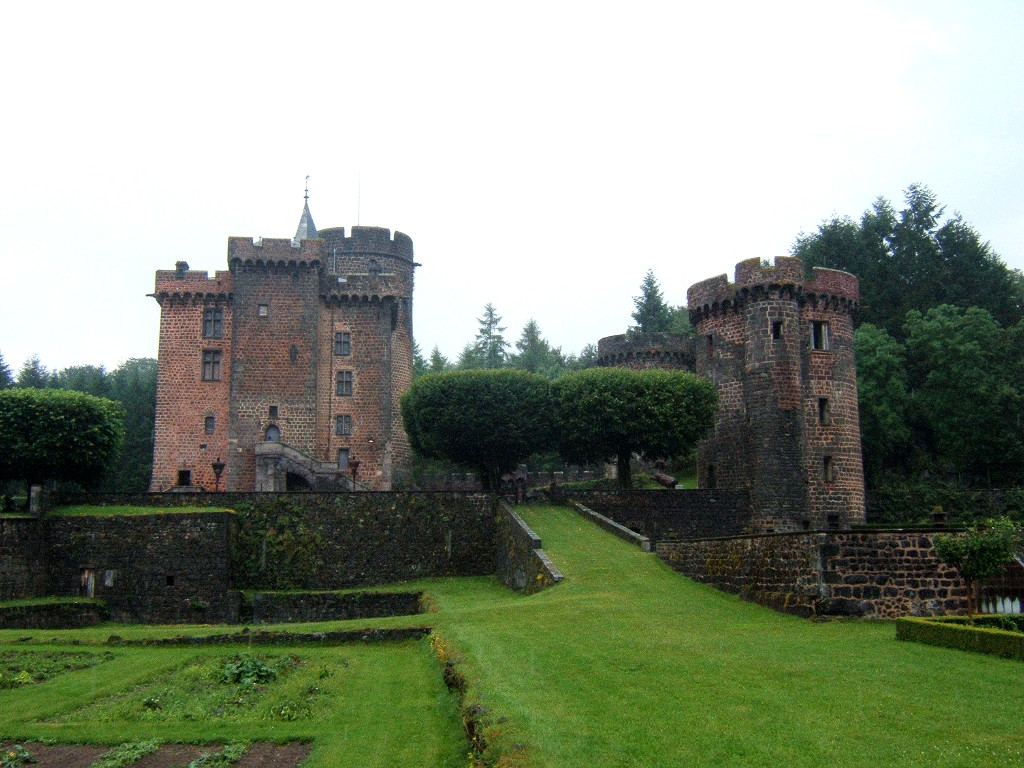
Façade with, on left, the square keep

Château-Dauphin is a medieval castle in the commune of Pontgibaud in the Puy-de-Dôme département of France.

== History ==
The castle owes its name to the coat of arms of the person who built it in the 12th century: Robert I, Count of Auvergne, on whose arms was a dolphin (dauphin). The original construction was modified in the 15th century by Gilbert III Motier de La Fayette, who strengthened the defences and enlarged the keep. Abandoned in the 17th century for a more comfortable building, and damaged during the French Revolution, the castle was finally restored in the 19th century by Count César III of Pontgibaud.

The castle has been occupied since 1756 by the family of a King's musketeer, César I de Moré. The present owners, the Count and Countess Gabriel de Germiny, are his descendants. The castle, garden and museum are open to the public.

== Architecture ==
The main building is a double keep. In effect, a round keep forms one of the corners of a strong square keep. The two parts are independent. The square keep is articulated around an interior court, covered in the 19th century by a glass canopy. The fortified curtain wall includes seven towers, of which six stand today. The castle includes a kitchen garden known from records of the 16th century. It was restored in the 18th century. There is also a museum dedicated to silver mining in the canton of Pontgibaud, mostly in the second half of the 19th century by the Société des mines et fonderies de Pontgibaud.

Château-Dauphin has been classified and declassified as monument historique by the French Ministry of Culture at various times since 1889. It was finally classified in 1995, covering the castle itself, six towers, common lands, the ground, well and fountain. The kitchen garden is also classified.

== See also ==
- List of castles in France
