= Masevaux-Niederbruck =

Commune in Grand Est, France

- Commune
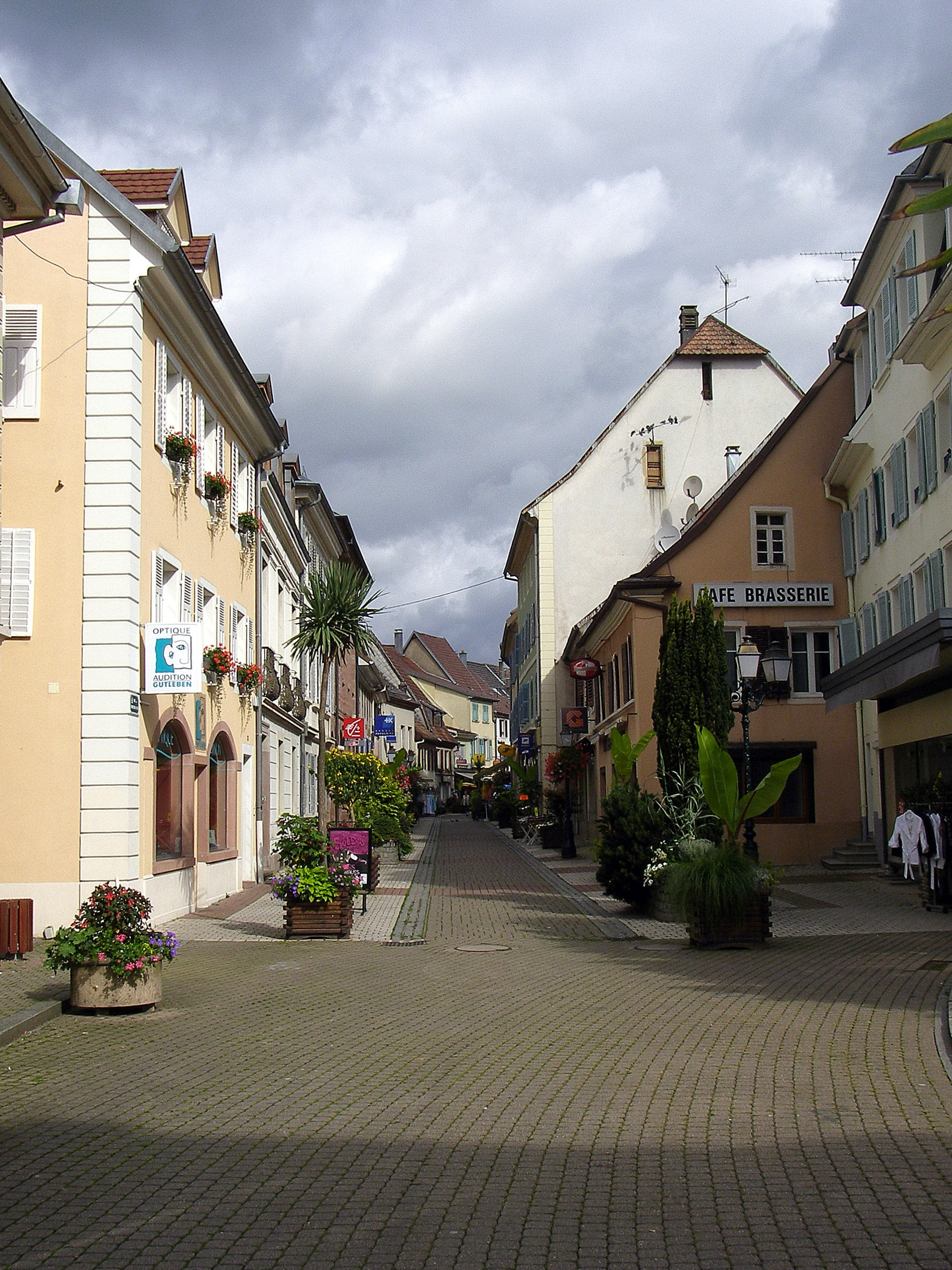
- A pedestrianised road in Masevaux
- Location of Masevaux-Niederbruck
- Location within France Location within Grand Est
- Coordinates: 47°46′26″N 6°59′49″E
- Country: France
- Region: Grand Est
- Department: Haut-Rhin
- Arrondissement: Thann-Guebwiller
- Canton: Masevaux-Niederbruck

Government
  - Mayor (2020–2026): Maxime Beltzung
- Area^{1}: 26.99 km^{2} (10.42 sq mi)
- Population (2023): 3,594
  - Density: 133.2/km^{2} (344.9/sq mi)
- Time zone: UTC+01:00 (CET)
  - Summer (DST): UTC+02:00 (CEST)
- INSEE/Postal code: 68201 /68290
- ^{1} French Land Register data, which excludes lakes, ponds, glaciers > 1 km^{2} (0.386 sq mi or 247 acres) and river estuaries.

Masevaux-Niederbruck (French pronunciation: [mazvo nidəʁbʁyk]; German: Masmünster-Niederbruck; Alsatian: Màsmìnschter-Niderbrucke) is a commune in the Haut-Rhin department of northeastern France. The municipality was established on 1 January 2016 and consists of the former communes of Masevaux and Niederbruck.

== Population ==
Population data refer to the area corresponding with the commune as of January 2025.

Historical population
Year	Pop.	±% p.a.
1968	3,660	—
1975	3,906	+0.93%
1982	3,680	−0.85%
1990	3,631	−0.17%
1999	3,698	+0.20%
2007	3,676	−0.07%
2012	3,798	+0.66%
2017	3,797	−0.01%
2023	3,594	−0.91%
Source: INSEE

== See also ==
- Communes of the Haut-Rhin department
