= Anna Garcin-Mayade =

French painter (1897–1981)

Anna Garcin-Mayade (17 January 1897 – 3 May 1981) was a French painter and a member of the French Resistance during the Second World War.

== Early life ==
She was born at Pontgibaud, the daughter of Elie Mayade, a blacksmith, and his wife Félicie, a dressmaker. She studied art in Paris, staying with an aunt who kept a gallery in Montmartre; there she became associated with Maurice Utrillo and Suzanne Valadon. At the age of seventeen, she became a pupil of Auguste Renoir. She joined the French Communist Party. At the outbreak of the Second World War, she was teaching at a girls' school; she soon joined the Resistance and did not hide her political beliefs.

== Wartime activities ==
On 30 October 1941, Charles de Gaulle, leader of the Free French, broadcast on the BBC from London, encouraging a national "Stand to Attention", in which French people would observe a five-minute silence in memory of those killed by the Germans, as a protest against the occupation of France. In 1943, when Garcin-Mayade encouraged her pupils to participate in another such exercise, two of them reported her to the authorities, and she was arrested and sentenced to five years' hard labour. On 10 May 1944, she was deported to Ravensbrück concentration camp.

While at Ravensbrück she was accused of sabotage and was transferred to a punishment camp at Rechlin. There she was encouraged by another Resistance member, Paulette Pradel, to begin drawing again. She produced many works illustrating the prisoners and the terrible conditions at the camp. The camp was liberated by the Swedish Red Cross in 1945, but her art works were burned for fear of typhus contamination. She later recreated many of them from memory, in oils and other media.

== Legacy ==
On the 70th anniversary of the Liberation, an exhibition of Garcin-Mayade's work was held in her home town of Pontgibaud. Many of her works are on permanent display at the Musée Michelet in Brive.

In her birthplace of Pontgibaud, the Collège Anna Garcin-Mayade was renamed in her honour.
