= Pontgibaud =

- Commune
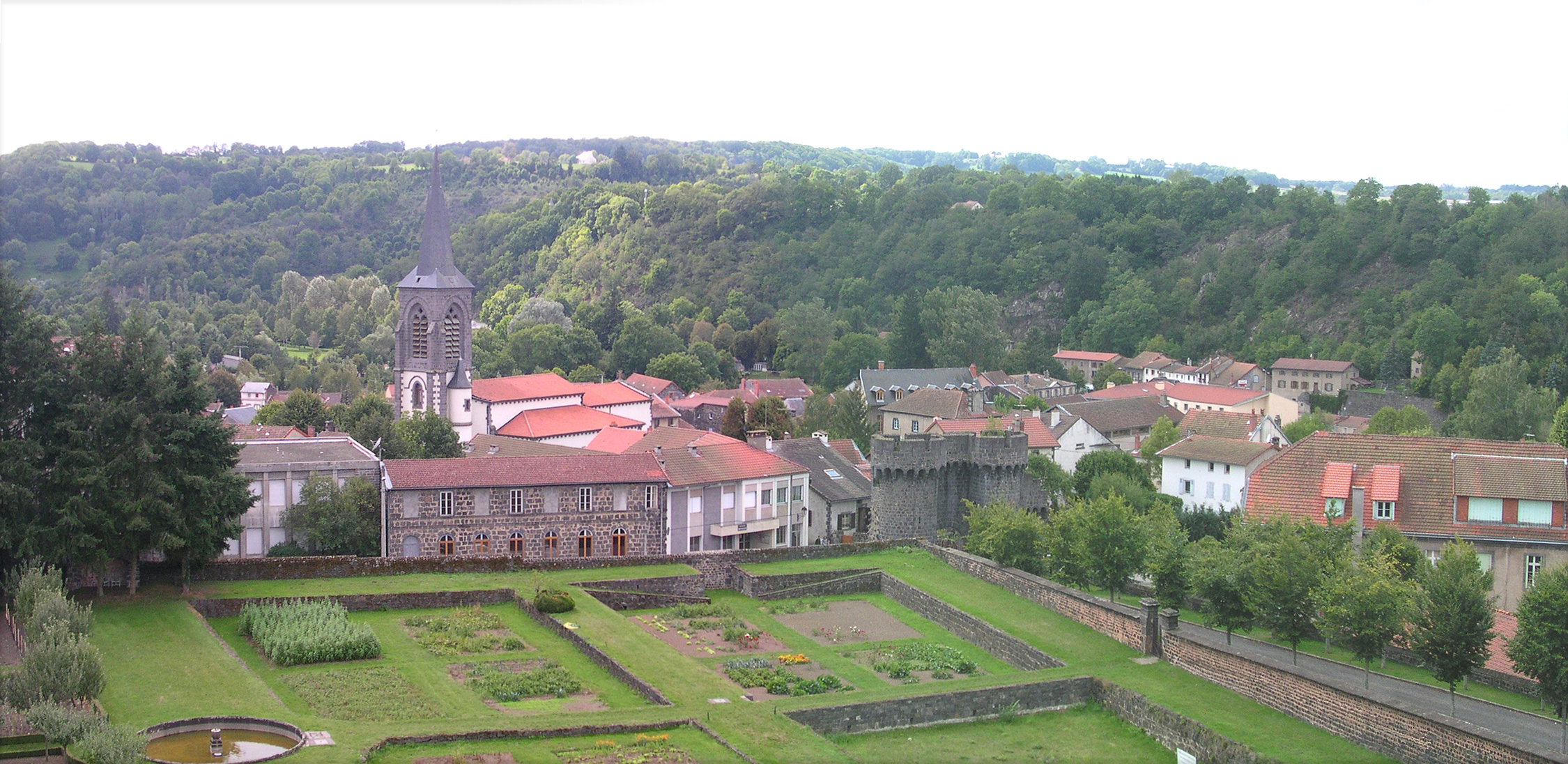
- Panorama de Pontgibaud

- Coat of arms
- Location of Pontgibaud
- Location within France Location within Auvergne-Rhône-Alpes
- Coordinates: 45°49′59″N 2°51′04″E
- Country: France
- Region: Auvergne-Rhône-Alpes
- Department: Puy-de-Dôme
- Arrondissement: Riom
- Canton: Saint-Ours

Government
  - Mayor (2020–2026): Jean-Jacques Lassalas
- Area^{1}: 4.59 km^{2} (1.77 sq mi)
- Highest elevation: 779 m (2,556 ft)
- Lowest elevation: 639 m (2,096 ft)
- Population (2023): 715
  - Density: 156/km^{2} (403/sq mi)
- Time zone: UTC+01:00 (CET)
  - Summer (DST): UTC+02:00 (CEST)
- INSEE/Postal code: 63285 /63230
- ^{1} French Land Register data, which excludes lakes, ponds, glaciers > 1 km^{2} (0.386 sq mi or 247 acres) and river estuaries.

Pontgibaud (French pronunciation: [pɔ̃ʒibo]) is a commune in the Puy-de-Dôme department in Auvergne in central France.

It is located in the Massif Central region of France on the banks of the river Sioule. The area around the town was historically known for silver and lead mining. The Société des mines et fonderies de Pontgibaud exploited the lead-silver mines between 1852 and 1897.

The remnants of Château-Dauphin, a 12th-century castle, are located in Pontgibaud.

John Ruskin spent October 7, 1840 exploring Pontgibaud. He reckoned it "Altogether the happiest day, as far as employment or scenery can go, I have had for these long five years".

== Notable people ==
- Anna Garcin-Mayade, painter and member of the French Resistance

== See also ==
- Communes of the Puy-de-Dôme department
