= Tréfimétaux =

French metallurgy conglomerate formed in 1962

- Industry: Metallurgy
- Predecessors: Tréfileries et Laminoirs du Havre, Compagnie française des métaux
- Founded: 1962
- Fate: Subsidiary
- Headquarters: Courbevoie, Hauts-de-Seine, France

Tréfimétaux is a French metallurgy conglomerate formed in 1962 by the merger of the Tréfileries et Laminoirs du Havre with the Compagnie française des métaux. In 1967, Tréfimétaux was acquired by Pechiney and in 1987 was sold to the Italian company SMI. Various plants were closed or sold over the years, leaving two factories in France at Givet (copper and brass tubes) and Niederbruck (copper bars). These factories are now operated by Tréfimétaux SAS, a subsidiary of Cupori (60%) and SMI (40%).

== Independent company ==
The Société J. Laveissière et Cie was founded in 1812 to manufacture copper products. In 1881 it was merged with the Société anonyme des établissements Secrétan to form the Société industrielle et commerciale des métaux. In 1900 it became the Compagnie française des métaux, employing 500 workers in a 30,000 square metres (320,000 sq ft) factory in Saint-Denis. Tréfileries et Laminoirs du Havre has its origins in the Société Lazare Weiller, created in 1883 by Lazare Weiller (1858–1928) to manufacture copper wire in Angoulême, which grew into a major metallurgy conglomerate.

In 1962, the Compagnie française des métaux merged with the Tréfileries et Laminoirs du Havre to form Tréfimétaux. In 1966 the wire drawing and steel cabling operations of Plant 2 at Le Havre were taken over by the Société des hauts fourneaux de Chiers-Châtillon, which opened a casting and rolling mill to manufacture small aluminum alloy cables in 1968. In 1969 Chiers-Châtillon merged with Cousin frères to form the Société Seine et Lys, which closed in 1972, laying off 425 people. Many of those who lost their jobs were women. In 1967 Tréfimétaux was acquired by Pechiney and became the copper division of that group, contributing 8% of the group's total.

== Pechiney subsidiary ==
In 1971, Pechiney merged with Ugine Kuhlmann to form Pechiney Ugine Kuhlman (PUK). From 1974 PUK suffered serious losses. The threat of mass dismissals was first aired in 1974. Between 1980 and 1987 the Tréfimétaux subsidiary reduced staff from 6,000 to 2,500 and closed the factories in Le Havre and Dives sur Mer. In 1980 it sold its cable production activities to Pirelli. In 1982 PUK was nationalized and restructured, resuming the name of Pechiney, and in 1986 under Jean Gandois the state-owned group began a major expansion.

== Successor operations in Le Havre ==
The Tréfimétaux copper mill in Le Havre closed in 1980, and in 1981 Tréfimétaux closed its remaining operations in Le Havre. It was succeeded by three companies: Cuivres et Alliages; Chiers, Châtillon Gorcy (which later became Hauts Fourneaux de la Chiers and then Technor); and Thomson Cables. Cuivres et Alliages was closed in 1984. In 1986 Tecnor, manufacturing wire cables and conductors, took an area of 158,000 square metres (1,700,000 sq ft) of the La Havre factories, of which 74,000 square metres (800,000 sq ft) were covered, with a line of casting, continuous rolling and wire drawing machines. Technor ceased operations in 1989–90. In January 2003 Tréfileries et Câbleries du Havre had 72 employees, falling to about 30 in April 2003.

== SMI subsidiary ==
In 1987 Péchiney sold 100% of Tréfimétaux to the Italian company SMI. In 1989 the Société Cuivre et Alliages, a subsidiary of Tréfimétaux since 1987, became a completely separate division. In 1990 the SMI subsidiary Europa Metalli acquired a majority of the shares of KM-Kabelmetal and became the largest copper processor in the world. In 1992 Tréfimétaux reorganized its rolled products division and consolidated its French distribution activities. In 1993 Europa Metalli and Tréfimétaux combined their management, which were divided into three operating segments: rolled products, tubes, and brass and copper bar. In 1995 Tréfimétaux, Europa Metalli of Italy and KM-Kabelmetal of Germany merged to become KME, a wholly owned subsidiary of SMI. In 2005 production of bars was moved into subsidiaries, with the French subsidiary taking the name Tréfimétaux Brass SAS. On 1 May 2007 Tréfimétaux SA was renamed KME France SAS, and Tréfimétaux Brass SAS was renamed KME Brass France SAS.

== Cupori subsidiary ==
In 2016 European Copper Tubes (ECT), the parent of Cupori OY^{(fi)} of Finland, became partners in the French operations of KME, covering the Givet (Ardennes) tube factory and the Niederbruck (Haut-Rhin) copper bar factory. The KME Italy tube factory in Serravalle Scrivia was included in the agreement. Cupori's Pori unit in Finland was also included. Under the agreement, which took effect on 2 March 2016, Cupori acquired 60% of the capital while KME retained 40%. The company was chaired by Mirko Kovats. KME France SAS was renamed to Tréfimétaux SAS.

== Sources ==
- Etienne Claire (12 September 1997), "Tréfilerie, laminoir, société des tréfileries et laminoirs du Havre, puis Tréfimetaux, puis Chiers-Châtillon, puis Tecnor", Base Mérimée (in French), Ministry of Culture
- Goncalves, Arielle (5 August 2010), "CHRONOLOGIE Pechiney, l'histoire mouvementée d'un ex-champion national", Les Echos (in French)
- Jacquet, Frederique (1998), "La Plaine", Des cheminées dans la plaine: cent ans d'industrie à Saint-Denis, autour de Christofle (1830–1930). (in French), creaphis editions, ISBN 978-2-907150-85-9
- Jannet, Claudio Jannet (1892), Le capital, la spéculation et la finance au XIXe siècle (in French), Paris: E. Plon, Nourrit et Cie
- L'Histoire de Tréfimétaux (in French), Tréfimétaux
- Lange, A. (6 March 2003), "Lazare Weiller (1858–1928), Meteore de l'histoire de la television", Histoire de la télévision (in French)
- Perrot, Albert (2005), "Le déclin dramatique des TRÉFILERIES et LAMINOIRS du HAVRE !", Le Havre, une ville qui sent l'usine et qui sent la mer et qui sent aussi la lutte (in French), Le fil rouge
- Remy, Pascal (7 March 2016), "Cupori et KME AG s'allient pour créer un géant européen du cuivre", usinenouvelle.com (in French)
