= Sérifontaine =

- Commune
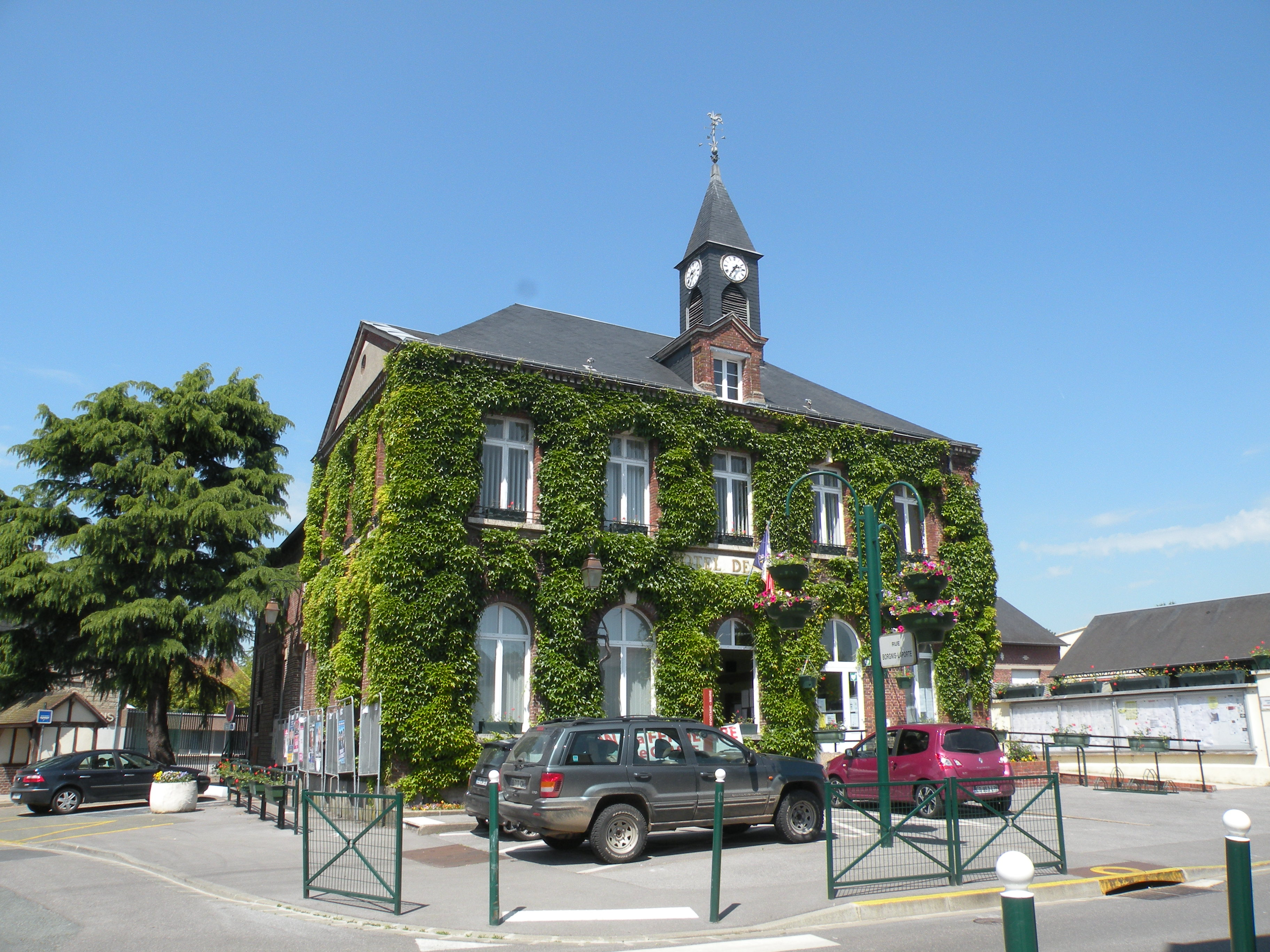
- The town hall
- Location of Sérifontaine
- Location within France Location within Hauts-de-France
- Coordinates: 49°21′14″N 1°46′16″E
- Country: France
- Region: Hauts-de-France
- Department: Oise
- Arrondissement: Beauvais
- Canton: Beauvais-2
- Intercommunality: CC du Pays de Bray

Government
  - Mayor (2020–2026): Pascal Auger
- Area^{1}: 20.43 km^{2} (7.89 sq mi)
- Elevation: 58 m (190 ft)
- Highest elevation: 200 m (660 ft)
- Lowest elevation: 56 m (184 ft)
- Population (2023): 2,784
  - Density: 136.3/km^{2} (352.9/sq mi)
- Time zone: UTC+01:00 (CET)
  - Summer (DST): UTC+02:00 (CEST)
- INSEE/Postal code: 60616 /60590
- Website: mairie-de-serifontaine.fr
- ^{1} French Land Register data, which excludes lakes, ponds, glaciers > 1 km^{2} (0.386 sq mi or 247 acres) and river estuaries.

Sérifontaine (French pronunciation: [seʁifɔ̃tɛn]) is a commune in the Oise department in northern France.

== Population ==
Historical population

Year	Pop.	±% p.a.
1793	562	—
1821	723	+0.90%
1846	861	+0.70%
1872	980	+0.50%
1901	1,455	+1.37%
1926	1,986	+1.25%
1946	1,411	−1.69%
1962	2,028	+2.29%
1968	2,209	+1.44%

Year	Pop.	±% p.a.
1975	2,340	+0.83%
1982	2,358	+0.11%
1990	2,477	+0.62%
1999	2,632	+0.68%
2007	2,531	−0.49%
2012	2,898	+2.75%
2017	2,755	−1.01%
2023	2,784	+0.17%

Source: EHESS and INSEE (1968-2023)

== See also ==
- Communes of the Oise department
