= Masevaux =

Commune in Haut-Rhin, France

Masevaux Màsmìnschter
- Part of Masevaux-Niederbruck
- Coat of arms
- Location of Masevaux
- Location within France Location within Grand Est
- Coordinates: 47°46′28″N 6°59′47″E
- Country: France
- Region: Grand Est
- Department: Haut-Rhin
- Arrondissement: Thann-Guebwiller
- Canton: Masevaux-Niederbruck
- Commune: Masevaux-Niederbruck
- Area^{1}: 23.21 km^{2} (8.96 sq mi)
- Elevation: 405 m (1,329 ft)
- Highest elevation: 1,191 m (3,907 ft)
- Lowest elevation: 392 m (1,286 ft)
- Population (2022): 3,219
  - Density: 138.7/km^{2} (359.2/sq mi)
- Time zone: UTC+01:00 (CET)
  - Summer (DST): UTC+02:00 (CEST)
- Postal code: 68290
- ^{1} French Land Register data, which excludes lakes, ponds, glaciers > 1 km^{2} (0.386 sq mi or 247 acres) and river estuaries.

Masevaux (French pronunciation: [mazvo] is the French name of Màsmìnschter (Alemannic German pronunciation: [mɒsˈmɪnʃtʁ̩]), a former commune in the Haut-Rhin department in north-eastern France.

== Demographic evolution ==
Historical population
Year	Pop.	±% p.a.
1962	3,326	—
1968	3,385	+0.29%
1975	3,601	+0.89%
1982	3,328	−1.12%
1990	3,267	−0.23%
1999	3,329	+0.21%
2007	3,234	−0.36%
2012	3,334	+0.61%
2022	3,219	−0.35%
Source: EHESS and INSEE (2007-2022)

== History ==
On 1 January 2016, it was merged into the new commune Masevaux-Niederbruck.

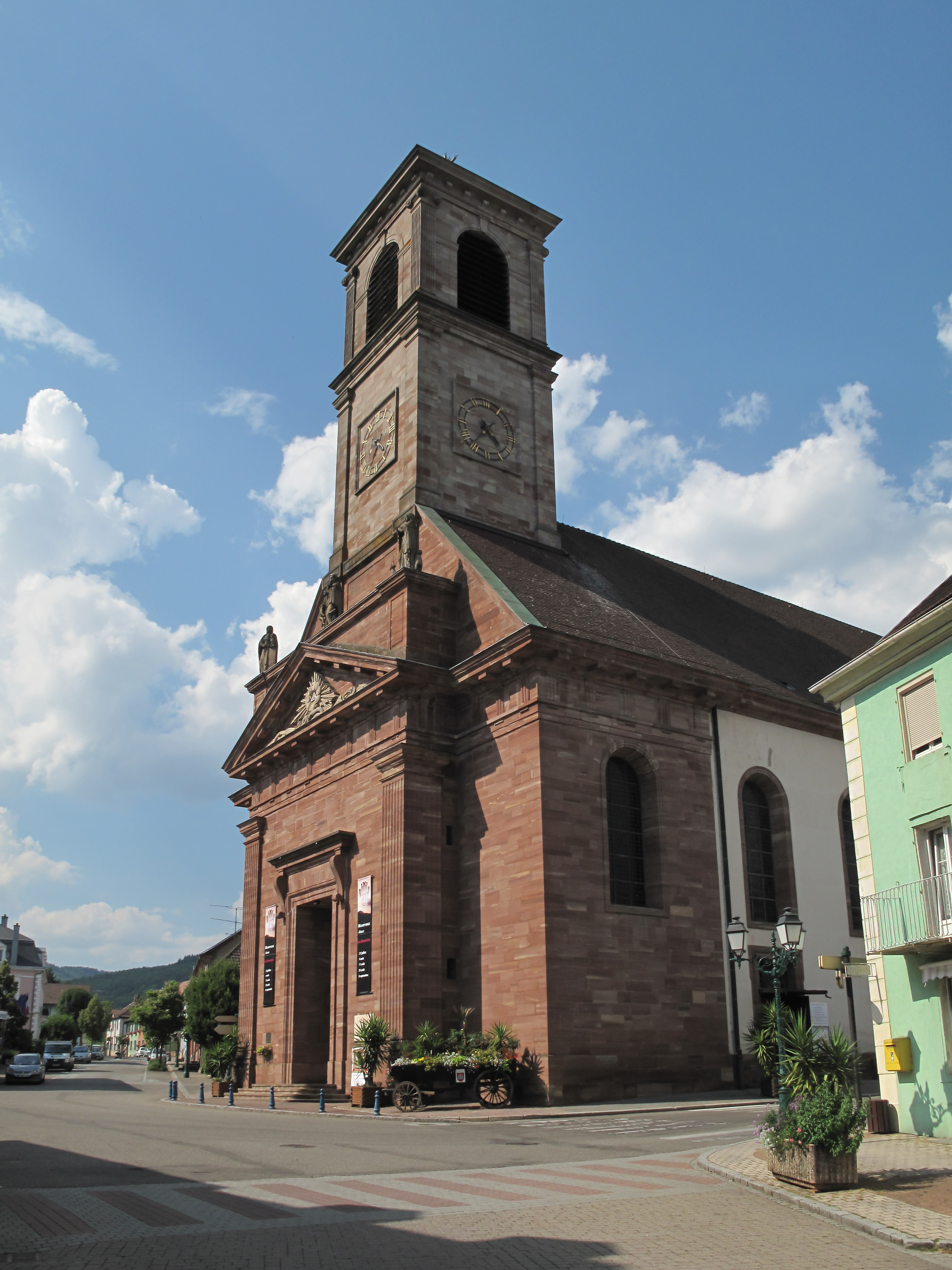
Church: église Saint-Martin

== Famous Residents ==
The organist and composer Jacques-Louis Battmann (1818–1886) was born in Masevaux.

== See also ==
- Communes of the Haut-Rhin département
