= Niederbruck =

Commune in Haut-Rhin, France

- Part of Masevaux-Niederbruck
- Coat of arms
- Location of Niederbruck
- Location within France Location within Grand Est
- Coordinates: 47°47′07″N 6°58′06″E
- Country: France
- Region: Grand Est
- Department: Haut-Rhin
- Arrondissement: Thann-Guebwiller
- Canton: Masevaux-Niederbruck
- Commune: Masevaux-Niederbruck
- Area^{1}: 3.78 km^{2} (1.46 sq mi)
- Elevation: 430 m (1,410 ft)
- Highest elevation: 950 m (3,120 ft)
- Lowest elevation: 420 m (1,380 ft)
- Population (2022): 396
  - Density: 105/km^{2} (271/sq mi)
- Time zone: UTC+01:00 (CET)
  - Summer (DST): UTC+02:00 (CEST)
- Postal code: 68290
- ^{1} French Land Register data, which excludes lakes, ponds, glaciers > 1 km^{2} (0.386 sq mi or 247 acres) and river estuaries.

Niederbruck (French pronunciation: [nidəʁbʁyk]; Alsatian: Nìderbrucke) is a former commune in the Haut-Rhin department in north-eastern France. On 1 January 2016, it was merged into the new commune Masevaux-Niederbruck.

== See also ==
- Communes of the Haut-Rhin department
