= Gustav Adolph Hagemann =

Danish engineer and businessman

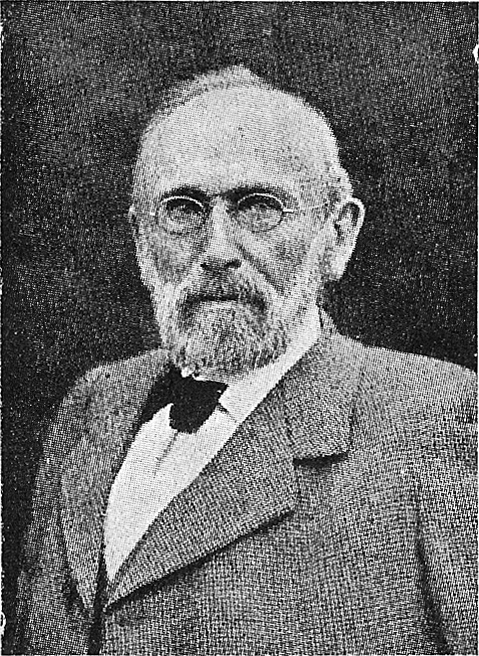

Rector of DTU
- In office 1902–1912
- Preceded by: Julius Thomsen
- Succeeded by: Harald Immanuel Hannover

Personal details
- Born: 16 May 1842 Rodsteenseje, Denmark
- Died: 26 April 1916 (aged 73) Snekkersten, Denmark
- Spouse(s): Mathilde Hagemann, née Bruun
- Parent(s): Otto Waldemar Hagemann; Sophie Marie Poulsen
- Education: Technical University of Denmark

Gustav Adolph Hagemann (16 May 1842 – 26 April 1916) was a Danish engineer and businessman. He was chief technical officer of the Danish Sugar Factories from 1872 to 1897 and then served as chairman of the board until 1916. He owned several sugar plantations on Saint Croix in the Danish West Indies.

== Early life and education ==
Hagemann was born on the Rodsteenseje estate at Odder in 1842, the son of Otto Waldemar Hagemann (1809–1890) and Sophie Marie Poulsen (1815–1901). His father owned the estate until 1857 when he returned to Holstein. Hagemann went to school in Aarhus before studying Applied Sciences at the College of Advanced Technology in Copenhagen from 1860 to 1865.

== Career ==
Hagemann was employed by the Øresund cryolite factory (Øresunds chemiske Fabriker, Kryolitfabrikken) in 1864. In 1865, when he had completed his exams, Kryolit Mine og Handelsselskabet sent him to the US to oversee the deliveries of cryolite to the Pennsylvania Salt Manufacturing Company. In early 1856, he travelled to the US to provide technical support in connection with the first deliveries of cryolite from Greenland.

With inspiration from David Alter's nearby production site, Hagemann began to work on improving methods to manufacture and purify bromine from salt wells. He obtained several patents and in the spring of 1868 established his first plant in Pomeroy, Ohio.

During a visit to Europe in the summer of 1869, C. F. Tietgen convinced Hagemann to purchase the Øresund cryolite factory in a partnership with Vilhelm Jørgensen (1844–1925). Hagemann then sold his bromine manufacturing activities in the US and settled permanently in Denmark.

Hagemann and Vilhelm Jørgensen also constructed Hinnerup Natroncellulosefabrik for Count Mogens Frijs and operated it on a ten-year lease. They also established Drakulla Cellulosefabrik in Småland, Sweden.

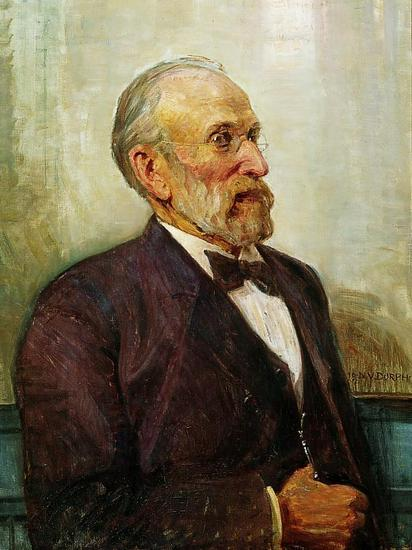
Hagemann painted by Niels Vinding Dorph

When De Danske Sukkerfabrikker ('The Danish Sugar Factories') were founded in 1872, Tietgen selected Hagemann for the position as chief chemist (Danish: overkemiker) in the new company. Hagemann oversaw the construction of the company's first manufacturing site, Sukkerkogeriet Odense, in Odense, which began operations in 1873–1874. He was then sent to the Danish West Indies to reorganize the sugar cane industry. St. Croix Fællessukkerkogeri started operations in 1878 and the last technical challenges were solved when Hagemann visited St. Croix for the third time in 1879.

Hagemann, who was appointed to chief technical officer in 1882, was also responsible for planning the new sugar manufacturing plants in Nakskov (1881), Assens (1883) and Stege (1883).

In 1894, Hagemann purchased the sugar plantation La Grange on Saint Croix and immediately began to modernize its operations. He also acquired the sugar plantations Prosperity, William, Wheel of Fortune and Punch.

Hagemann retired from the position as chief technical officer of De Danske Sukkerfabrikker in 1897 but then served as chairman of the company from 1898 until his death.

Hagemann had also joined the board of Burmeister & Wain in 1893 and became its chairman in 1898. The company was then reorganized and outdated machinery was modernized. He was also involved in the establishment of the first Danish steel works and introduced a new focus on diesel engines.

== Other pursuits ==
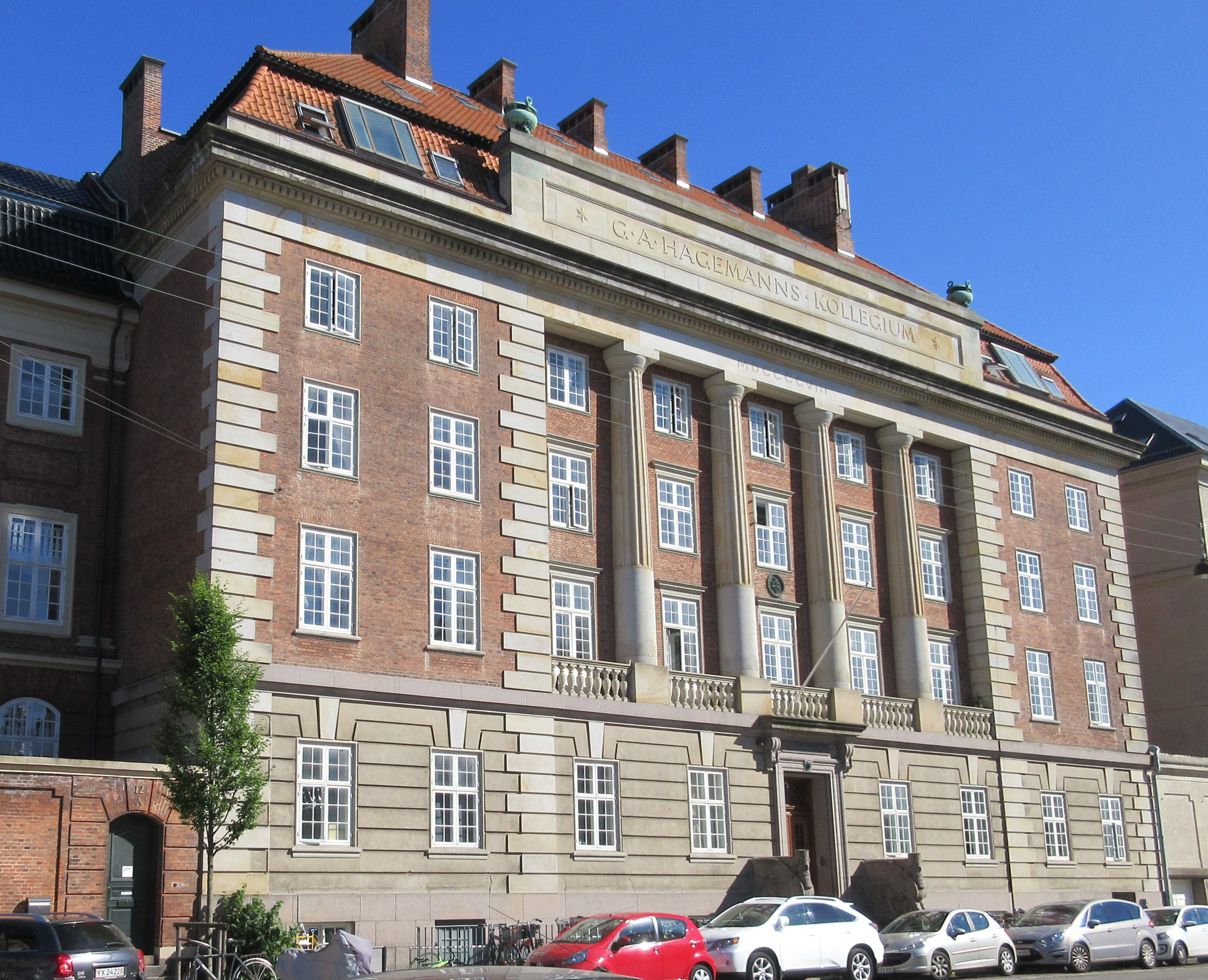
G.A. Hagemanns Kollegium in Copenhagen

Hagemann was a member of a number of important boards and commissions. He was a co-founder of the Danish Association of Engineers and served as its president from 1895 to 1898. He was president of the Danish College of Advanced Technology from 1902 to 1912. He was also a member of Copenhagen City Council from 1882 to 1902.

He supported Niels Finsen economically and contributed to the fight against tuberculosis. He founded G.A. Hagemanns Kollegium and created a number of associated grants for students in 1928. It was the first dormitory in Copenhagen that was open to both male and female residents.

== Personal life ==
Hagemann married Mathilde Bruun (27 September 1846 – 16 January 1931) in Assens. She was the daughter of local merchant, savings bank manager and deputy consul Bertel Brun (1820–1894) and Margrethe Sophie Frederikke Brin née Brasch (1825–1893).

Hagemann purchased Borupgård at Snekkersten in 1899. In 1911 he also acquired Bergsjöholm in Scania. He died at Borupgård on 26 April 1916 and is buried at Vestre Cemetery in Copenhagen.

He left three children. The elder of the two sons, Gunnar Aage Hagemann (1877–1971), was a medical doctor. He inherited Bergsjöholm from his father and was also the owner of Søbækgaard in Espergærde, Ristrup in Jutland (1908–1916) and Ruuthsbo in Scania. His daughter, Antonie Sophie Hagemann (1879–1954), married the physician and chemist Karl Albert Hasselbalch. They owned Borupgård. The younger son, Paul Olaf Hagemann (1882–1967), married Elisabeth Marie Gammeltoft (1886–1925), a daughter of his father's colleague Carl Gammeltoft.
