= Øresunds chemiske Fabriker =

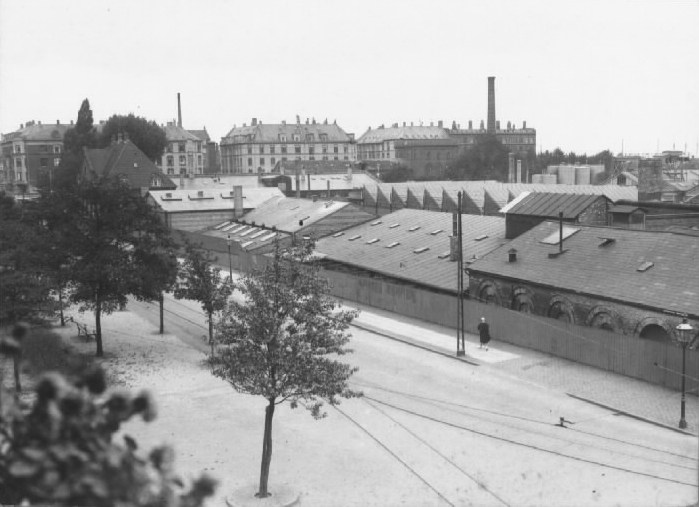
Øresunds chemiske Fabriker

Øresunds chemiske Fabriker (lit. "Øresund Chemical Industries"), colloquially known as Kryolitfabrikken (The Cryolite Factory), was a cryolite processing plant established in 1859 at Strandboulevarden in Copenhagen, Denmark.

== History ==
The company was established as Fabrikken Øresund by Th. Weber & Co. in 1859 based on a plan by professor Julius Thomsen (1826-1909) for manufacturing washing soda from cryolite from a cryolite factory in Greenland. The activities were later that same year expanded with an alum plant and a few years later with a Stråmasse plant.

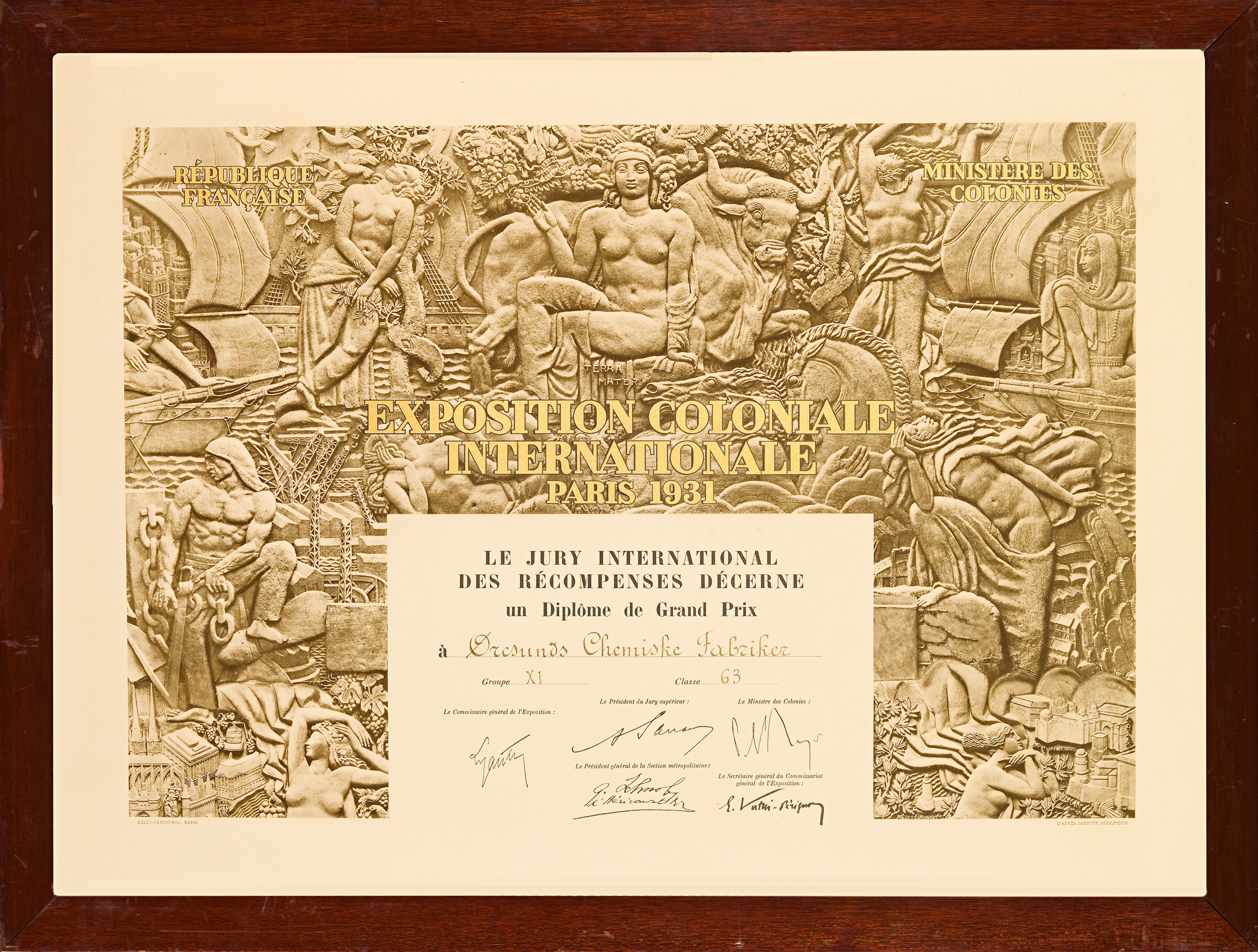
Diploma from the Paris Colonial Exhibition.

Gustav Adolph Hagemann started working for the company as a student in 1864. In 1865, when he had completed his exams, Kryolit Mine og Handelsselskabet sent him to the US to oversee the deliveries of cryolite to the Pennsylvania Salt Manufacturing Company. In early 1856, he travelled to the US to provide technical support in connection with the first deliveries of cryolite from Greenland. With inspiration from David Alter's nearby production site, Hagemann began to work on improving methods to manufacture and purify bromine from salt well. He obtained several patents and in the spring of 1868 established his first plant in Pomeroy, Ohio.

Fabrikken Øresund was hit hard and went into administration when the market price of washing soda suddenly dropped dramatically in 1866. When Hagemann visited Denmark in the summer of 1869, C. F. Tietgen convinced him to purchase kryolitfabrikken Øresund in a partnership with Vilhelm Jørgensen (1844-1925). Hagemann then sold his bromine manufacturing activities in the US and settled permanently in Denmark.

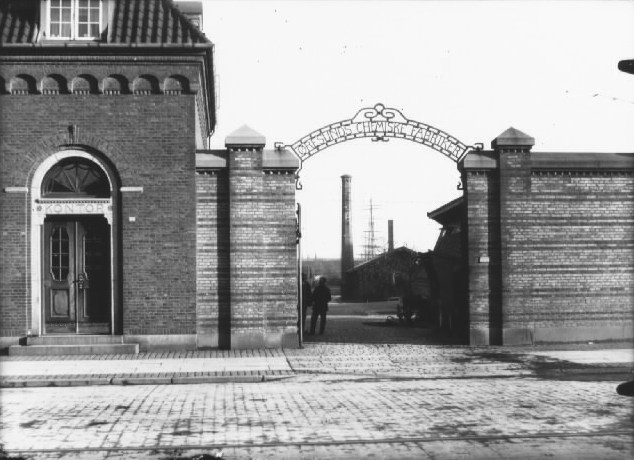
The entrance in 1921

Hagemann and Jørgensen changed the name of the company to Øresunds chemiske Fabriker in 1870. That same year they also expanded the plant with a sulfuric acid factory. The production of soda decreased from the 1870s and was discontinued in 1894. The production of sulfuric acid had already been discontinued in the 1880s as a result of a contract with Fredens Mølle. The core activity was from then on purification of cryolite for use in the global aluminium, glass and enamel industries.

The company was in 1902 converted into a public limited company (aktieselskab). In 1912 it was converted into a kommanditselskab solely owned by Vilhelm Jørgensen's son, C. F. Jarl (born1872).

=== Kryolitselskabet Øresund A/S ===
The company's cryolite was on 1 January 1940 ceded to Kryolitselskabet Øresund A/S (a company founded by Greenland's Home Office), Kryolith Mine og Handels Selskabet A/S and Øresunds chemiske Fabriker.

Kryolitselskabet Øresund A/S took over Øresunds Chemiske Fabrikker's premises on Strandboulevard. The head office of Øresunds Chemiske Fabrikker was instead moved to Østbanegade 121.

The Strandboulevarden plant closed in 1990. The company merged with Incentive A/S in 1992, and Incentive A/S went bankrupt in 2004.
