= Sukkerfabrikken Møn =

Former sugar factory in Stege, Denmark

Coordinates: 54.981°N 12.276°E

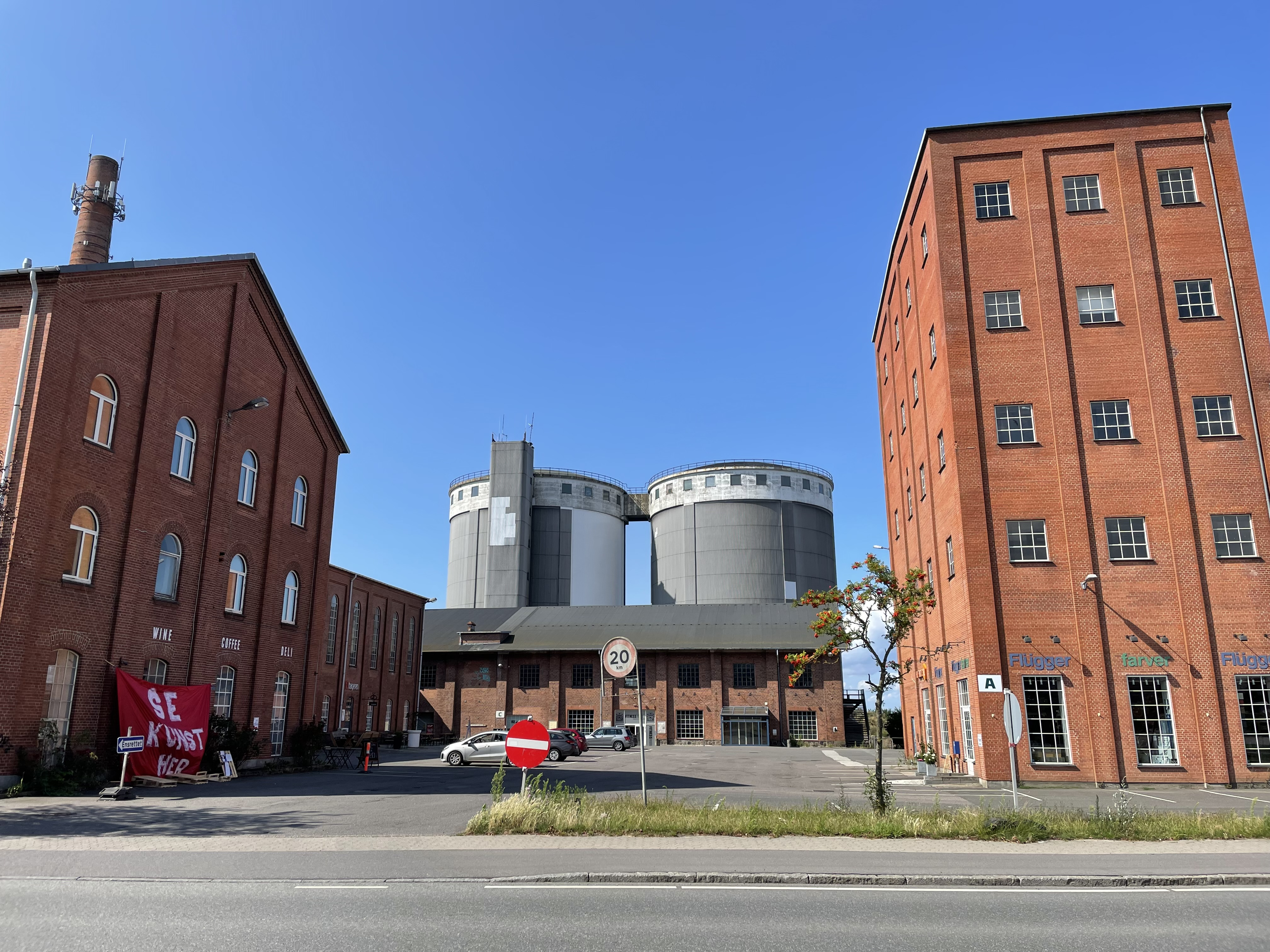
Stege Sugar Factory in 2022.

Sukkerfabrikken Møn, formerly known as Stege Sugar Factory (Danish: Stege Sukkerfabrik), is a former sugar factory situated in Lendemarke, west of Stege on Møn, Denmark. Established by De Danske Sukkerfabrikker in 1884, it was the first major industrial plant on the island and remained its largest employer until its closure in 1989. It is now operated as a local centre for business, culture and tourism.

== History ==
The De Danske Sukkerfabrikker (Danish Sugar Factories) was founded at the initiative of Carl Frederik Tietgen on 20 April 1872. Since its foundation, the company invested heavily in developing a local sugar industry based on sugar beets from Funen, Lolland-Falster and Møn. Its first sugar factories were located in Odense on Funen and Holeby and Nakskov on Lolland. A group of local citizens from Møn, headed by Frede Bojsen, a chairman of Stege parish council and founder of Rødkilde Højskole who owned a local farm, started campaigning for the establishment of another sugar factory at Stege. Their proposal was initially turned down by Tietgen but later accepted after they had won the support of Gustav Adolph Hagemann.

The factory opened in 1884. A private harbour was constructed as part of the project. The factory was initially also served by three so-called juice stations at Damme, Damsholte and Pollerup. Sugar-beet juice from the juice stations were pumped to the factory through underground pipelines. Two more juice stations were later added at Mern on Zealand and Ny Borre on Møn. The pipeline from Mern crossed the Queen Alexandrine Bridge. A private narrow-gauge rail line connected it to Pollerrup east of Stege.

The sugar factory was decommissioned in 1989.

== Buildings and surroundings ==
One of Ludvig Fenger's rendering from 1883.

The sugar factory complex comprises some 10 buildings. The old main building was constructed in 1884 to designs by the architect Ludvig Fenger. Two large siloes were constructed in 1956. A large new factory building was constructed to a Functionalist design in the 1869s. The youngest building is a canteen building from 1985.

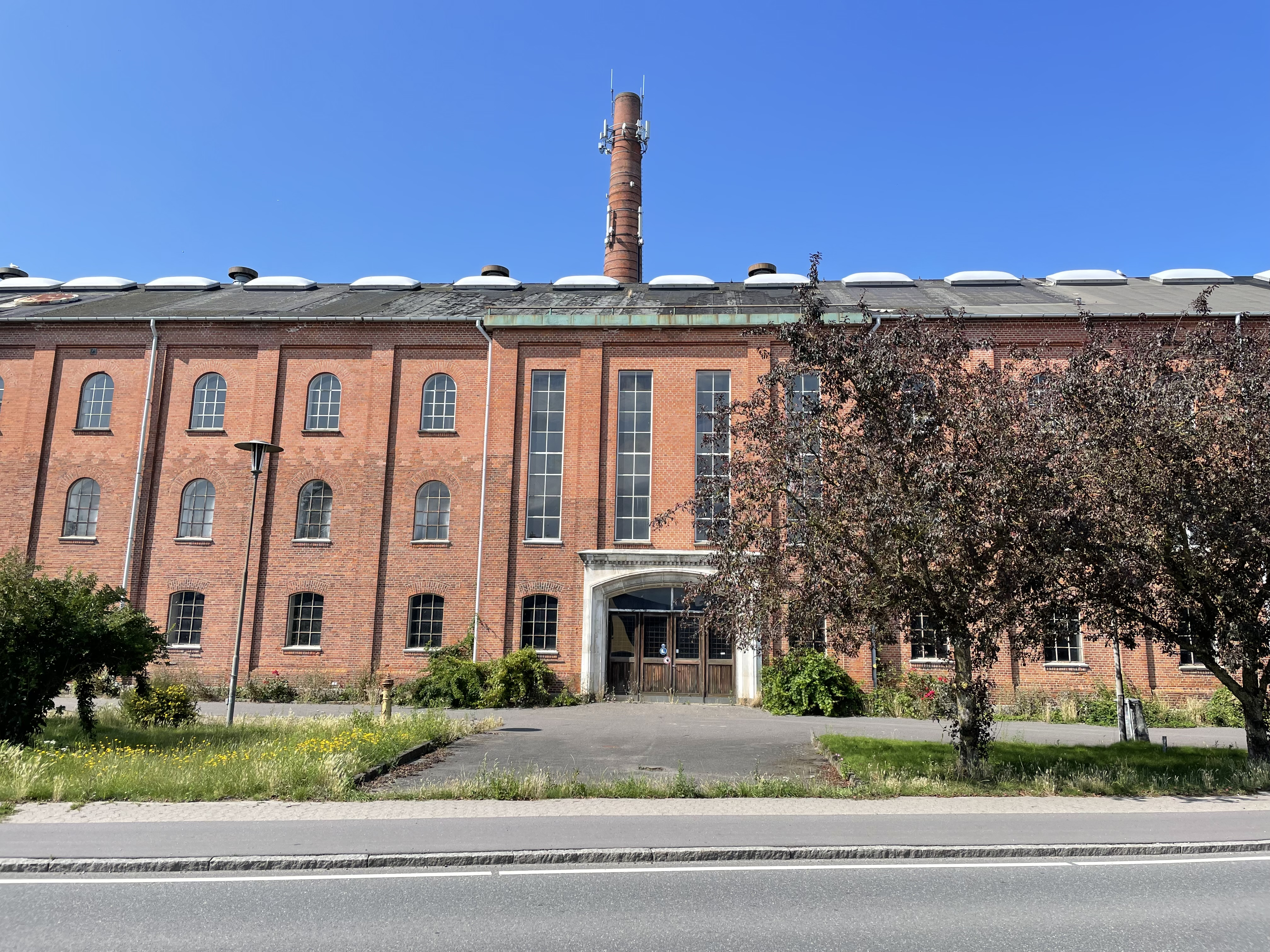
The old main building.

Opposite the factory, along the streets Fabriksgade and Nygade lige over, is a development of terraced workers' houses, dating from the 1890s. Dwellings for white-colar workers and a house for the director of the factory are located on Strandvejen.

The Washing sugar beets at Stege Sugar Factory resulted in a large amount of surplus soil. In the 1960s, De danske Sukkerfabrikker created a series of basons for dumping this soil. They were later joined by more basins. The basins gradually became more or less filled with soil. The last of these basins were dug out in 1982–83. The supply of soil ceased when the factory closed in 1989. The area was subsequently acquired by Møn Municipality with the aim of creating a new recreational area close to Stege. The area was protected in 1993.

== Today ==
In 2022, plans were presented for converting the former industrial site into a holiday resort with room for 2,500 guests. The plans comprised a hotel, 500 holiday homes wellness wellness, restaurants and facilities for other activities.

== See also ==
- Højbygaard Sugar Factory
