= Erhard Frederiksen =

Danish agronomist (1843–1903)

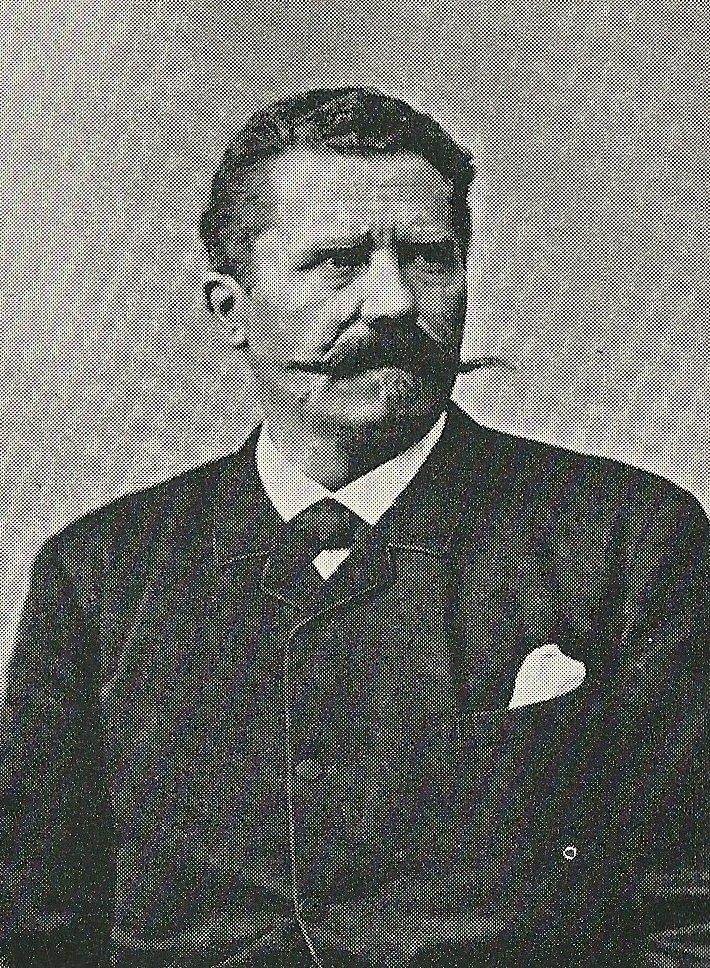
- Born: 7 January 1843; Fuglsang, Denmark
- Died: 12 October 1903 (aged 60); Vordingborg, Denmark
- Occupation: Agricultural economist
- Awards: Knight of the Dannebrog, 1897

Erhard Frederiksen (7 January 1843 – 12 October 1903) was a Danish agronomist and sugar manufacturer. He is considered one of the most significant writers on agricultural economics of his time in Denmark. He was a co-founder of a sugar factory at Holeby on Lolland in 1872–1874, which was later taken over by the Danish Sugar Factories under the name Højbygaard Sugar Factory.

== Early life and education ==
Frederiksen was born at Fuglsang, the son of Ditlev Friderichsen (1791–1861), the owner of Nøbbøllegård, and wife Maria Hansen (1811–1901). He was the brother of Johan Ditlved Frederiksen, Kirstine Frederiksen and Niels Christian Frederiksen.

Frederiksen graduated from Sorø Academy in 1857 and then spent two years on his father's estate to obtain practical experience with farming before enrolling at the Royal Danish Agricultural College from where he graduated as an agricultural economist in 1862. In 1862–1863, he then worked under Edward Tesdorpf as assistant manager at Ourupgård. He was also introduced to the dairy business by Thomas Riise Segelcke and visited a number of the most innovative agricultural estates across Denmark. He studied the latest trends in agriculture on a study trip to Germany, the Netherlands, Belgium, England and Scotland.

== Early career in agriculture ==
Frederiksen managed Nøbbøllegård for his mother from 1863 after his father had died in 1861 and became the owner of the estate in 1866. He enthusiastically introduced and experimented with many of the new technologies and principals that he had studied at the Royal Agricultural College and abroad.

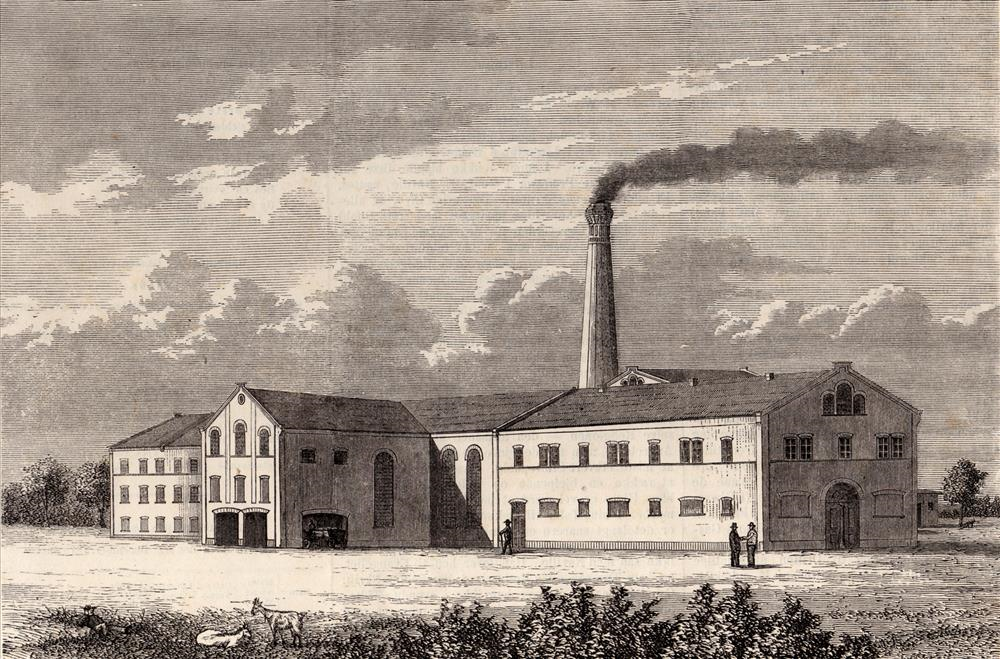
Lolland Sufar Factory

In 1871, his brother, Johan Ditlved Frederiksen, returned from a journey to Germany where he had studied sugar production based on sugar beets. The two brothers constructed the Lolland Sugar Factory in 1872–1874, but it was hit hard by a combination of unfortunate circumstances. The 1872 Baltic Sea flood flooded much of Lolland and a new tax on sugar beets was in the same time introduced in 1873. It also turned out to be more difficult than expected to convince local farmers to grow sugar beets for the production. Industribanken cancelled their credit in 1876 and the company went bankrupt the following year. Frederiksen also lost his estate which was taken over by Privatbanken. The factory was reopened by C. F. Tietgen's Danish Sugar Factories under the name Højbygaard Sugar Factory in 1880.

In 1878, Frederiksen was a co-founder and the first managing director of Københavns Mælkeforsyning. In 1870–80, he visited England and Alsace-Lorraine on a government stipend to study malted barley. He instigated annual malt barley exhibitions and that Landhusholdningsselskabet in 1883 a malt barley committee of which he was an active member.

== Writer and editor in Copenhagen ==
After his bankruptcy, Frederiksen began a career as a writer and editor in Copenhagen. His brother-in-law, V. Topsøe, editor-in-chief of Dagbladet, invited him to become editor of a new agriculture supplement in 1884. In 1879, he started the publication of Landbrugstidende, but it merged with Ugeskrift for Landmænd when he was appointed as co-editor the following year. He remained in the position until 1 January 1904. He also wrote for other magazines and contributed to E. Møller-Holst's Landbrugs-Ordbog.

== Back to Lolland ==
In 1882, C. F. Tietgen offered him a position as a consultant for De Danske Sukkerfabrikker. Frederiksen resided at Svingelgård at Nakskov where he engaged in breeding of barley and sugar beet varieties besides his work as consultant and co-editor of Ugeskrift for Landmænd. He was a member of the Seed Control Commission (Frøkontrolkommissionen) and co-founded Foreningen af danske landbrugskandidater in 1897 and served on the board until his death.

== Personal life ==
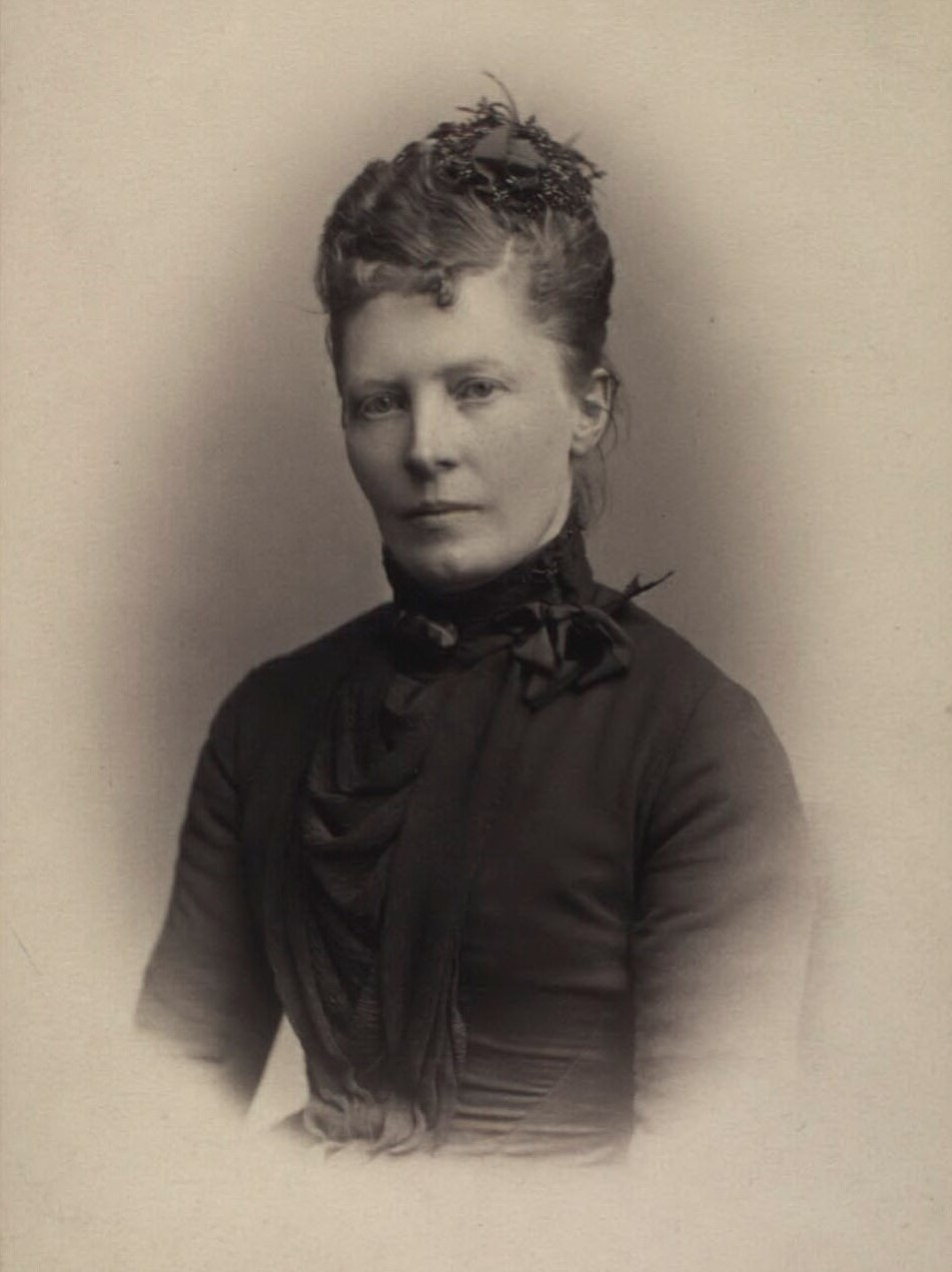
Sigrid Frederiksen

As a young student in Copenhagen, Frederiksen moved in the highest intellectual circles. He was a frequent visitor in the homes of prominent cultural and political figures such as Ditlev Gothard Monrad, Carl Ploug, Niels Laurits Høyen and Constantin Hansen.

He married Sigrid Marie Elisabeth Topsøe (1844–1925, herredsfoged, kancelliråd Søren Christian Topsøe (1797–1847) and Sigrid Christine Gudrun Thorgrimsen (1813–86), on 28 May 1874 in the Church of Holmen in Copenhagen. He was the father of V. Erhard-Frederiksen.

Frederiksen was awarded the Order of the Dannebrog in 1897. He died on 12 October 1903 and is buried at Vestre Cemetery in Copenhagen. In 1917, farmers on Lolland erected a memorial to Frederiksen outside Maribo. It was designed by H. C. Glahn and is located at the junction between the roads to Nakskov and Rødby.
