= Hans Peter Nielsen =

Hans Peter Nielsen may refer to:

- Hans Peter Nielsen (politician) (1852–1928), Danish politician
- Hans Peter Nielsen (gymnast) (born 1943), Danish Olympic gymnast
