= La Grange, U.S. Virgin Islands =

Coordinates: 17°43′09″N 64°52′43″W

La Grange, United States Virgin Islands
- Village
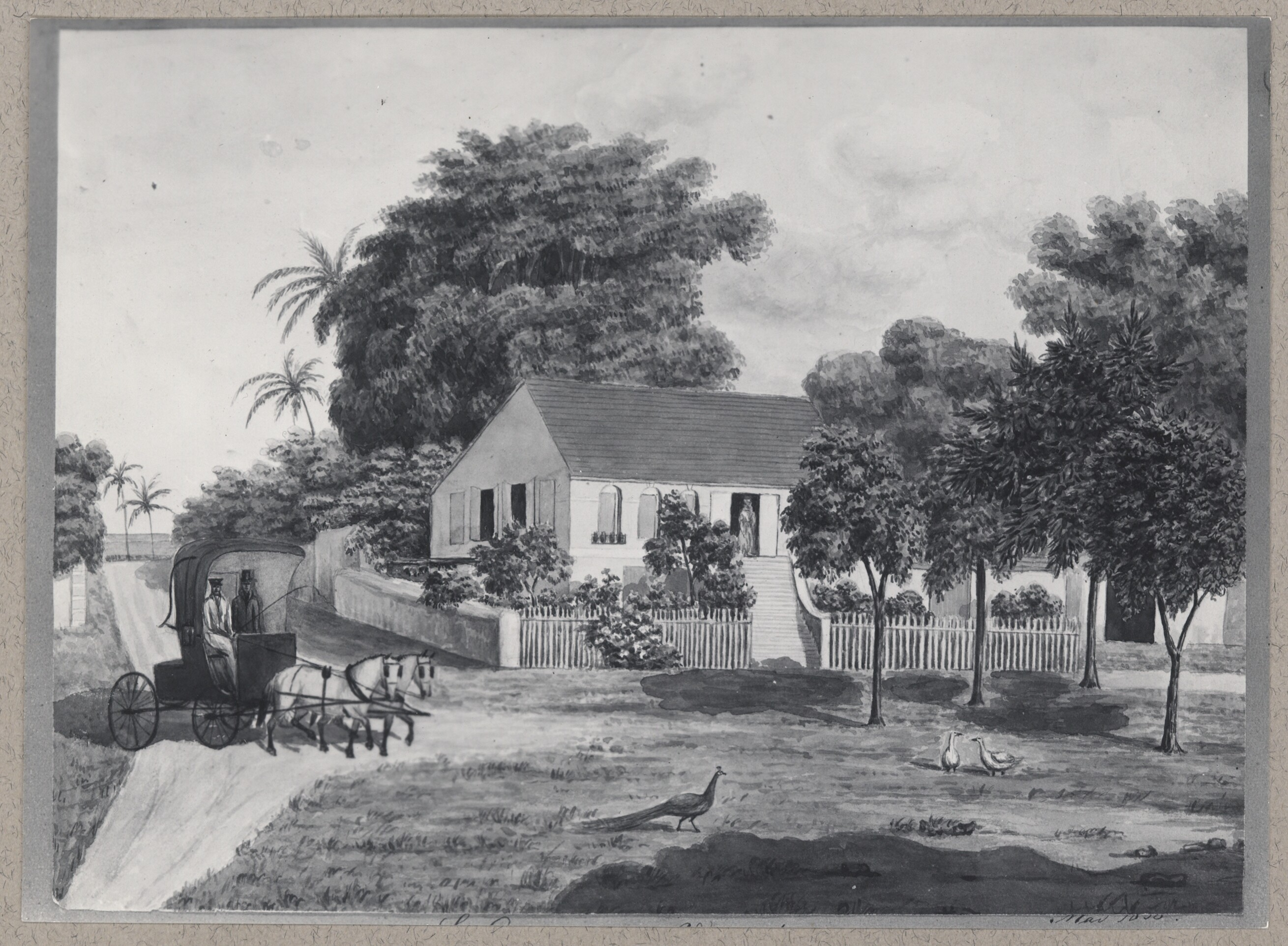
- La Grange depicted by Frederik von Scholten in May 1939.
- Interactive map of La Grange, United States Virgin Islands
- Country: United States Virgin Islands
- Island: Saint Croix
- Time zone: UTC-4 (AST)

La Grange is a settlement on the island of Saint Croix in the United States Virgin Islands.

== History ==
In the Danish West Indies colonial era, La Grange was the name of a sugar plantation. In 1894, it was acquired by Gustav Adolph Hagemann, chief technical officer of De Danske Sukkerfabrikker (lit. 'the Danish Sugar Factories'), who immediately modernized the operations. He also acquired the sugar plantations Prosperity, Williams, Wheel of Fortune and Punch⊋
