= Carl Gammeltoft =

Danish business executive

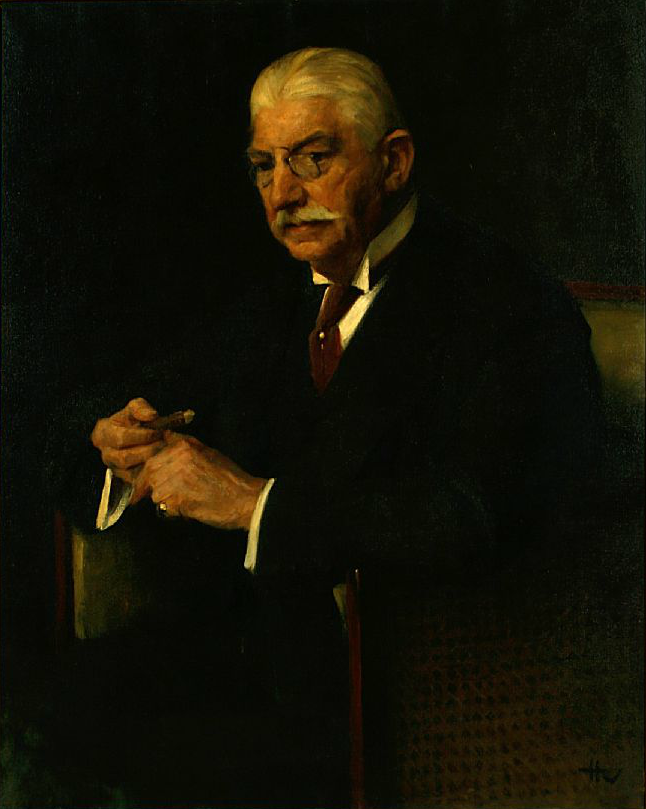
- Carl Gammeltoft painted by Herman Vedel
- Born: 20 September 1855; Copenhagen, Denmark
- Died: 1 February 1934 (aged 78); Copenhagen, Denmark
- Occupation: Industrialist
- Awards: 1st-Class Commander of the Dannebrog

Carl Gammeltoft (20 September 1855 – 1 February 1934) was a Danish business executive. He served as managing director of De Danske Sukkerfabrikker (lit. 'the Danish Sugar Factories') from 1882 to 1922.

== Early life and education ==
Gammeltoft was born in Copenhagen, the son of headmaster and later mayor C. Gammeltoft (1818–1873) and Cathrine M. P. Nimb (1817–1881). He was an apprentice in Hans Puggaard & Co. The company played a central role in De Danske Sukkerfabrikker. He later spent a few years abroad, working some of the time for Lloyd's in London.

== Career ==
Back in Denmark, in 1881, he was employed as a senior clerk (prokurist) in De Danske Sukkerfabrikker. In 1882, at just 27 years old, he was appointed as director alongside Gustav Adolph Hagemann. Gammeltoft, being an outstanding organizer and merchant, helped the young company successfully through the crisis years for the sugar industry. His strategy during World War I secured Denmark easier and cheaper access to sugar than any other market in Europe. He retired from the company in 1920.

Gammeltoft was a specialist judge at the Maritime and Commercial Court (Sø- og Handelsretten) from 1893 to 1910. He was a member of Privatbanken's bank council from 1921 to 1928. He was a chairman of the insurance companies Forsikrings A/S Nye Danske af 1864 and Reassuranceforeningen and of the glass factory Kastrup Glasværk.

== Personal life ==
Gammeltoft married Henriette Marie Herforth. They had five children: Svend Aage Gammeltoft, Poul Henrik Gammeltoft, Elisabeth Marie Gammeltoft, Karen Margrethe Gammeltoft and Carl Christian Gammeltoft. Poul Gammeltoft served as Supreme Court justice from 1938 to 1954.

Gammeltoft is one of the businessmen depicted in Peder Severin Krøyer's monumental 1895 group portrait painting From Copenhagen Stock Exchange in Børsen. He was created a Knight in the Order of the Dannebrog in 1897, a Commander of the 2nd Class in 1919 and a Commander of the 1st Class in 1927. He was awarded the Cross of Honour in 1905.

He died on 1 February 1934 in Copenhagen and is buried at Vestre Cemetery.
