= Højbygaard Sugar Factory =

Former Danish sugar factory

Coordinates: 54.7116°N 11.4816°E

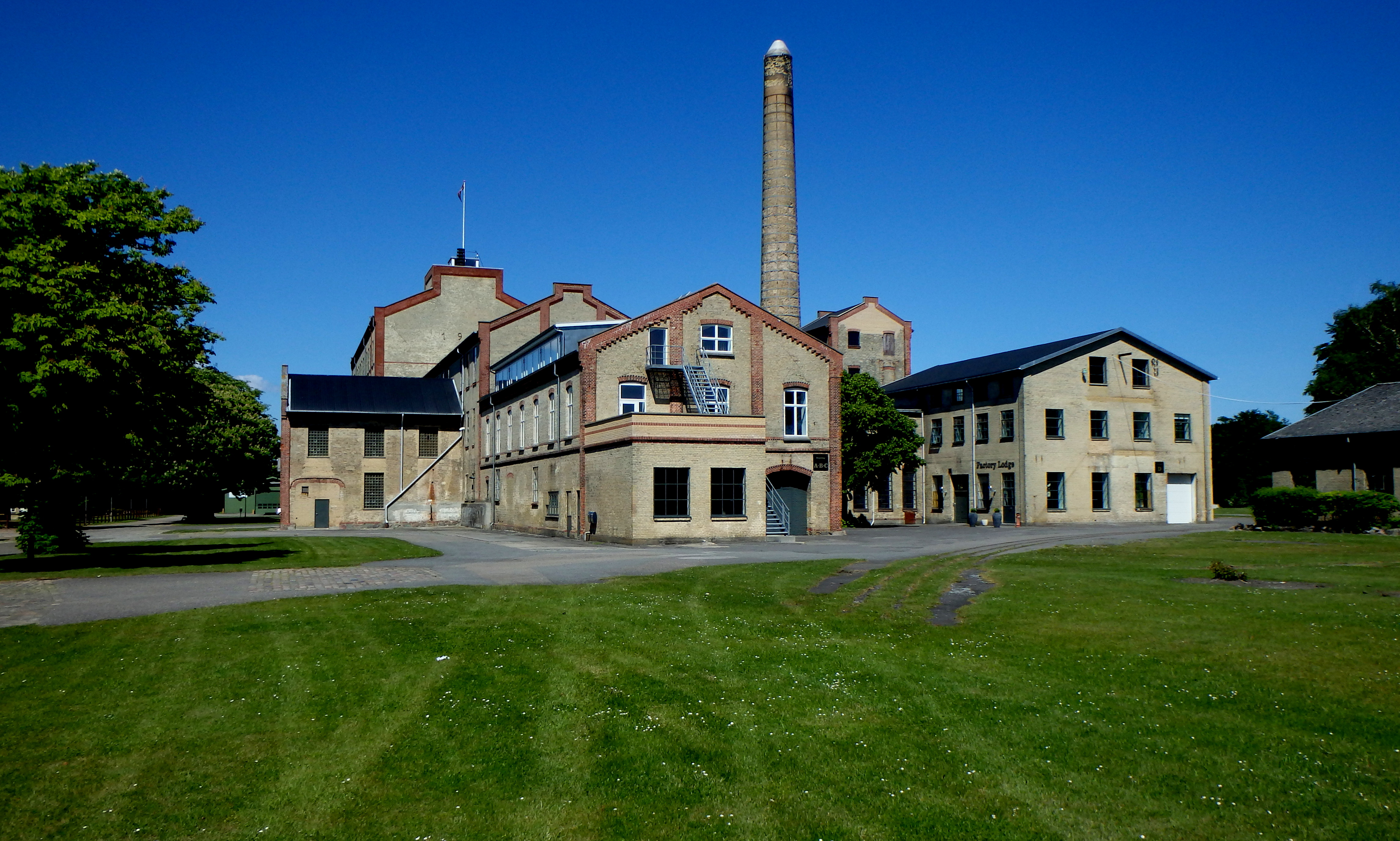
The former factory in 2013

Højbygaard Sugar Factory (Danish: Højbygaard Sukkerfabrik) was built in 1872–74 at Holeby on Lolland in southeastern Denmark. It was one of the first modern sugar factories built for the country's emerging sugar beet industry. It was taken over by De Danske Sukkerfabrikker in 1877 and operated until 1959. The buildings were then acquired by De Forenede Papirfabrikker (transl. United Paper Mills) and operated as a paper mill under the name Højbygaard Papirfabrik from 1960 to 1993.

The Højbygaard Sugar Factory complex was listed as a National Industrial Site in 2009. It has been renovated and is now home to a combination of offices, a hotel and a conference centre under the name Factory Lodge and is also home to the Visual Climate Center.

== History ==
=== Lolland Sugar Factory ===
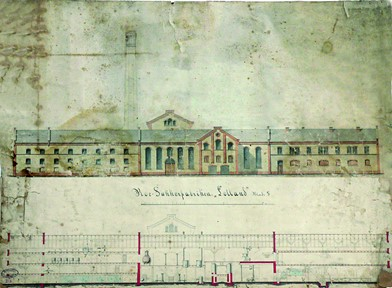
A rendering of the factory from Braunschweigische Maschinenbauanstalt

The sugar factory was constructed in 1872–74 by the Erhard and Johan Ditlev Frederiksen under the name Sukkerfabrikken Lolland. Erhard Frederiksen had inherited the estate Nøbbøllegård in 1861. They had both studied agricultural economy at the Royal Veterinary and Agricultural College in Copenhagen and later studied beet sugar production on study trips to Germany.

The factory was designed by Maschinenbauanstalt Braunschweig in Germany, which also delivered most of the machinery. Burmeister & Wain provided the large boilers, and the brothers arranged for the planned railway between Maribo and Rødby to swing by the estate with a stop at nearby Holeby.

The enormous quantities of water that were needed for the sugar production came from Maribo Lake. A short 700 mm gauge railway connected the new Holeby Station with the factory. The sugar beets were transported in open wagons drawn by horses (a standard gauge side track from Holeby Station was constructed in 1875). Holeby Haveby (Holeby Garden Town), a development with forty residences for workers, was also constructed.

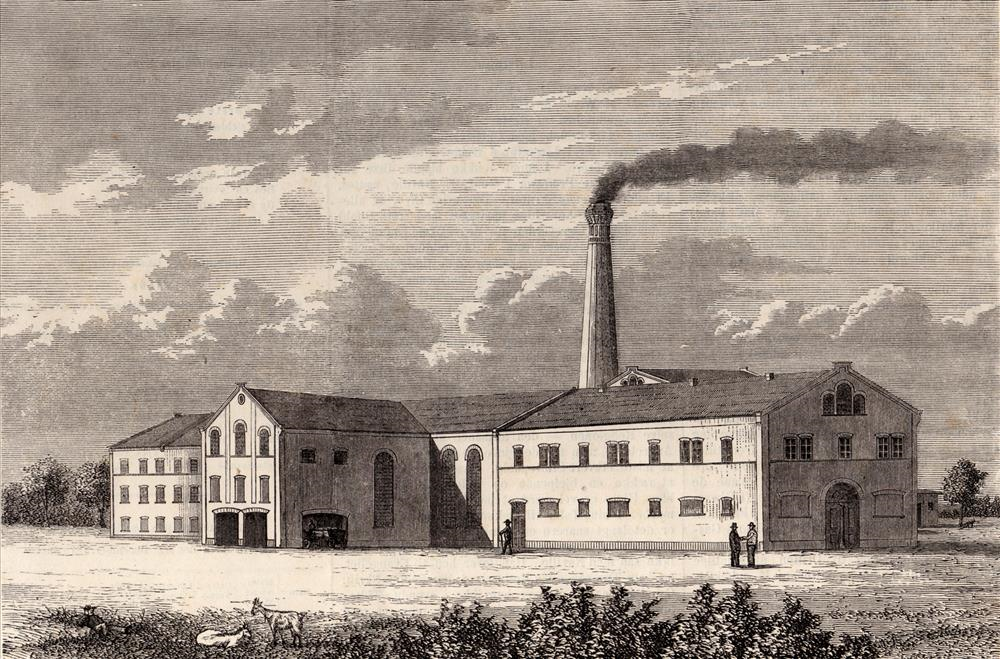
Lolland Sugar Factory

The opening of the factory was, however, hit hard by a combination of unfortunate circumstances. Its opening was delayed by the 1872 Baltic Sea flood, which flooded large parts of Lolland. The business was at the same time affected negatively by the introduction of a new tax on sugar beets in 1873. It also turned out to be more difficult than expected to convince local farmers to grow sugar beets. The factory went bankrupt in 1877.

Erhard Frederiksen moved to Copenhagen, where he worked as an agriculturalist editor and writer. Johan Ditlev Frederiksen emigrated to America, where he achieved success in the dairy industry.

=== Højbygaard Sugar Factory and the Danish Sugar Factories ===
After the bankruptcy, the creditors renamed the factory Højbygaard Sugar Factory. Gerhard Faye was hired as the new manager of the factory. He had for some years served as chief chemist of Lolland Sugar Factory.

The factory was sold to De Danske Sukkerfabrikker in 1880. Founded at the initiative of Carl Frederik Tietgen in 1872, De Danske Sykkerfabrikker had already obtained a dominant position on the Danish market. The new owners immediately expanded the factory. In 1882, Faye left the factory to assume a position as manager of Nakskov Sugar Factory.

The Lolland Railway could not provide enough open wagons for the 3-month "sugar campaign", and Højbygaard therefore purchased 15 wagons from Kockums in Malmø. These B 1-15 wagons transported sugar beets to the factory from all of Lolland until 1898, when they were sold to the Lolland Railway and operated as LJ Nc 381–395.

The railway network on the property was upgraded and expanded in 1894, and a small steam locomotive was purchased from WG Bagnall in Stafford, England. It was replaced by newer machines in 1902 and 1905. A total of 16 km of 700 mm tracks owned by the factory and 17 km of tracks owned by private sugar beet growers were constructed. The railway network was at Fuglsang Manor connected to that of Maribo Sugar Factory. By 1922, there were 178 open wagons operating on the network.

Højbygaard Sugar Factory was expanded several times over the next decades. A new four-track carriage house was constructed in 1949. The first diesel locomotive was acquired from John Fowler & Company in 1948.

In 1959, De Danske Sukkerfabrikker decided to rationalize their production in fewer locations, and Højbygaard Sugar Factory was decommissioned at the end of the 1960 sugar campaign. The sugar beets from the catchment area were from then on processed at the sugar factory in Maribo.

=== Høhbygaard Paper Mill ===
The decommissioned Højbygaard complex was in 1960 sold to De forenede Papirfabrikker and later reopened as Højbygaard Paper Mill. The factory manufactured paper based on straw. The paper mill closed in 1993.

== Today ==
The Højbygaard Sugar Factory complex has now been converted into offices, a hotel and conference centre operated under the name Factorylodge and the Visual Climate Center, an interpretive centre dedicated to climate, energy and environmental issues.
