= Herman Vedel =

Danish painter

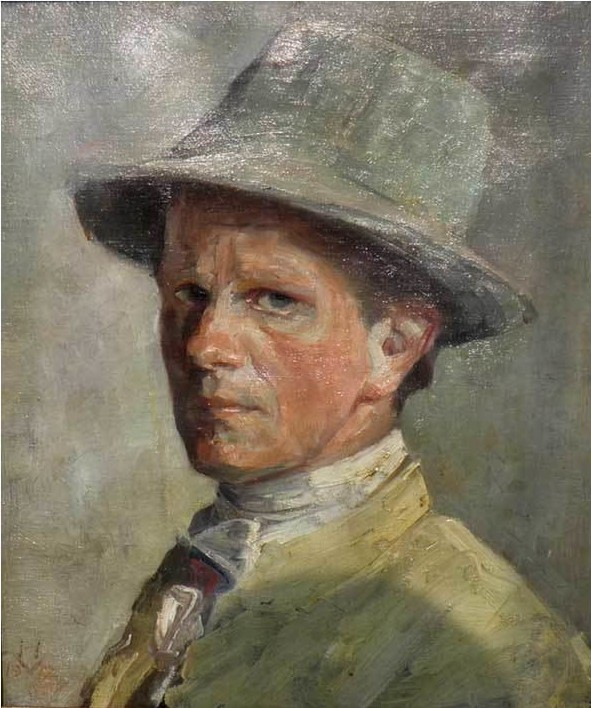
- Self portrait by Herman Vedel
- Born: Herman Albert Gude Wedel; 1 March 1875; Copenhagen, Denmark
- Died: 1 December 1948 (aged 73); Copenhagen, Denmark
- Education: Royal Danish Academy of Art
- Known for: Painting
- Awards: Eckersberg Medal; Thorvaldsen Medal

Herman Vedel (1 March 1875 – 1 December 1948) was a Danish painter. He was the leading Danish portraitist of his time. One of his most well-known works is Negotiating the 1915 Constitution which features prominently in Christiansborg Palace.

== Biography ==
Herman Albert Gude Vedel was born in Copenhagen, Denmark. He attended the Copenhagen Technical College where he trained under Henrik Grønvold (1858–1940). He was educated at the Royal Danish Academy of Fine Arts from 1894 to 1897. He earned his cand. phil. in 1893. He also attended the art school Kunstnernes Frie Studieskoler from 1896 to 1899.

After his debut at Charlottenborg with Portrait of a young girl in 1900 (Danish National Gallery), he quickly became a sought after portraitist.

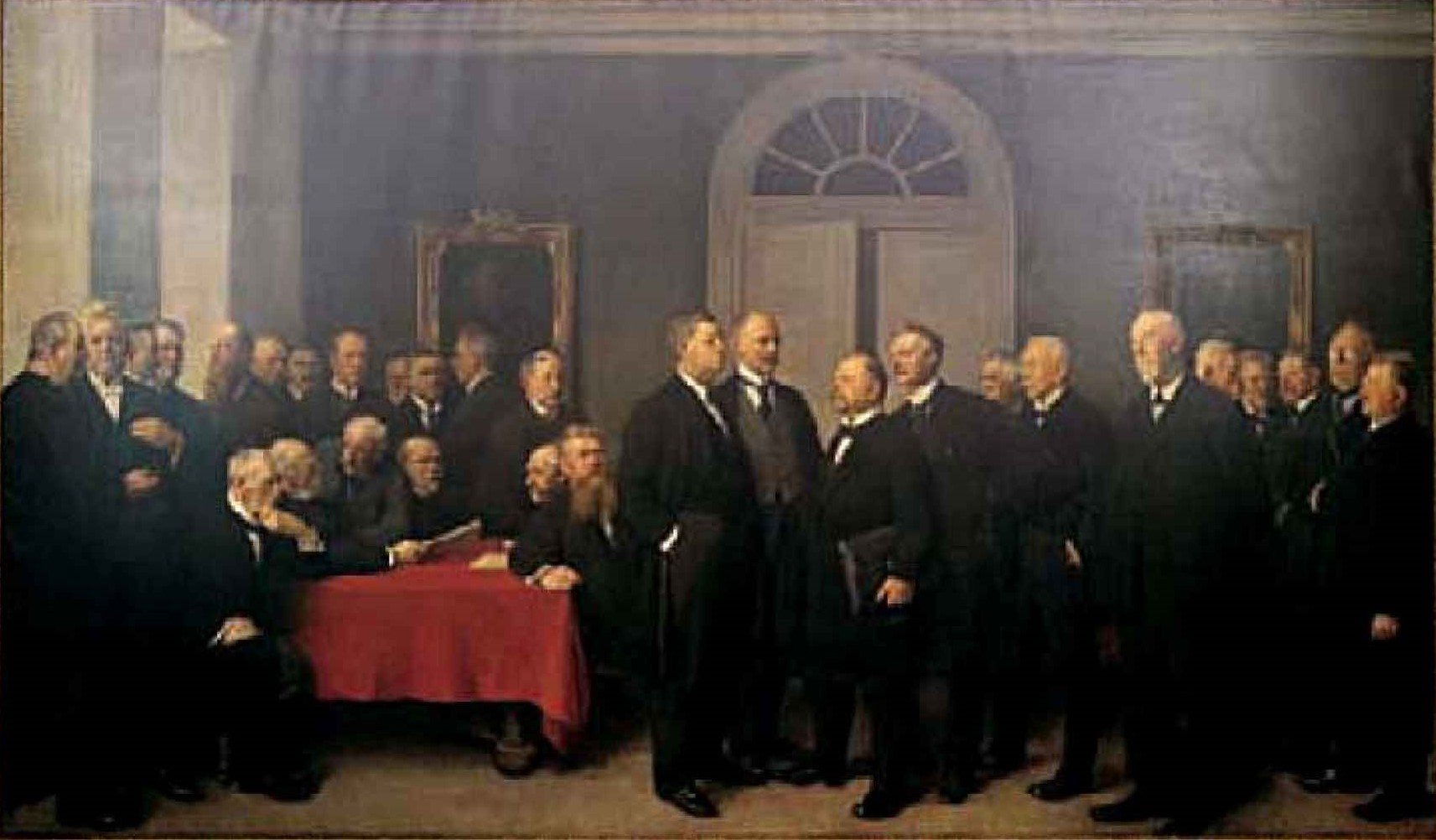
Negotiating the 1915 Constitution

Wedel specialized in portrait painting from an early age. He painted a vast number of prominent figures of his time, including, critic and scholar Georg Brandes, Nobel Prize-winning author Johannes V. Jensen and polar explorer Knud Rasmussen. He also painted a group portrait, Negotiating the 1915 Constitution.

== Awards ==
- Eckersberg Medal (1909)
- Thorvaldsen Medal (1918)

== Gallery ==
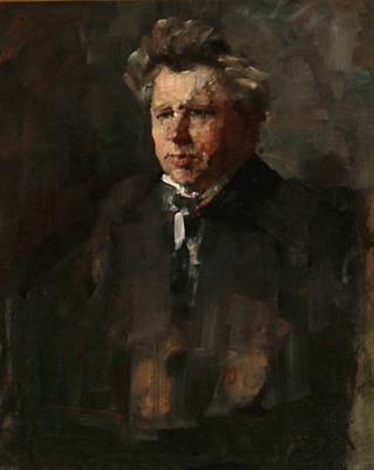
Jeppe Aakjær

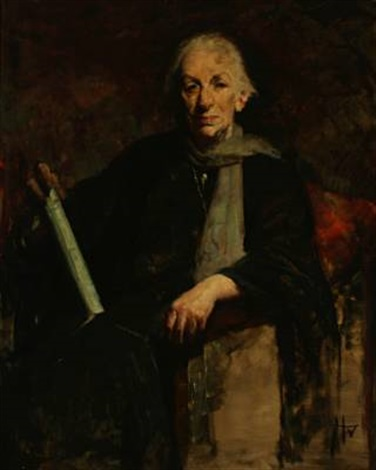
Elisabeth Dons

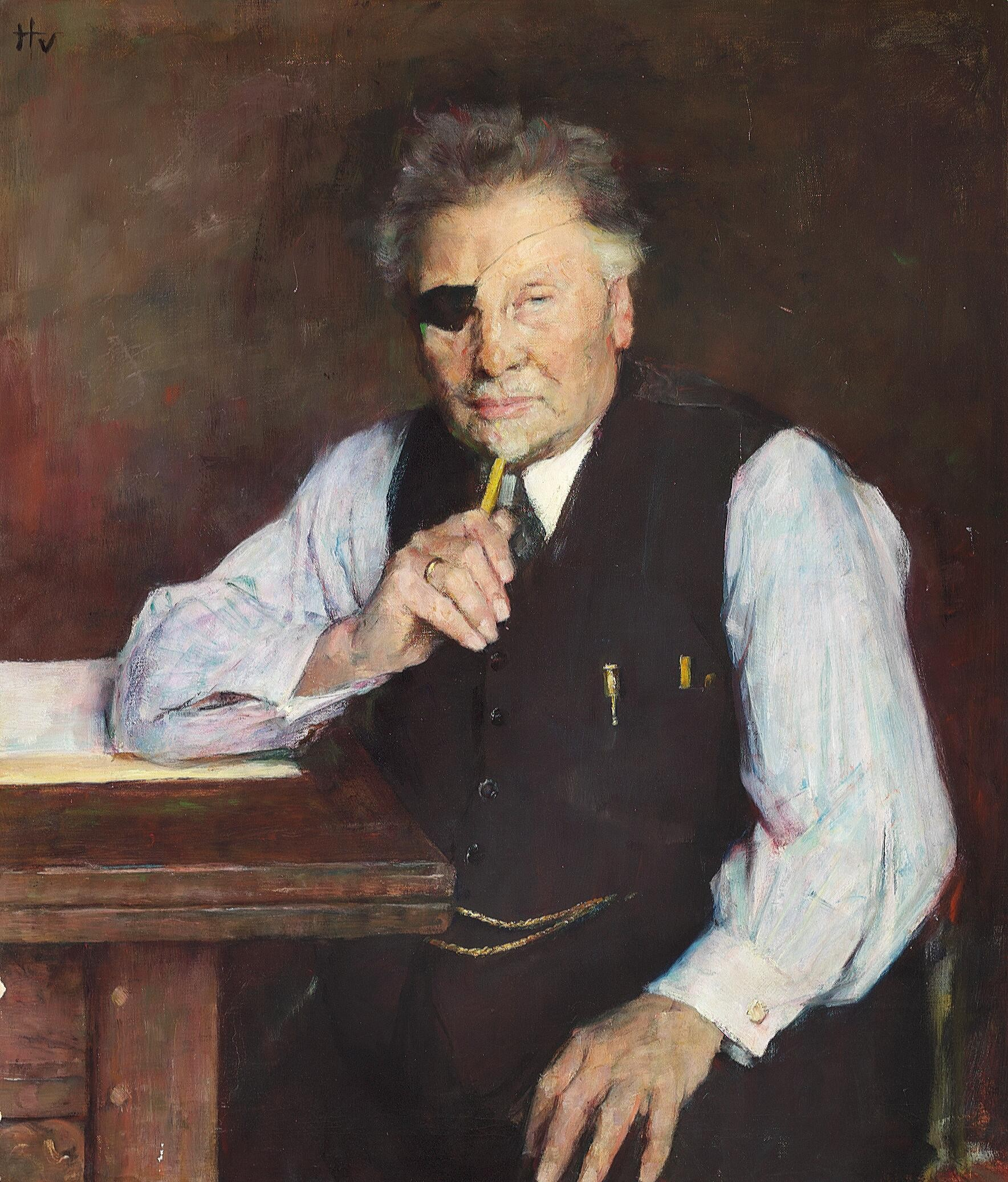
Christian Diederich Lerche

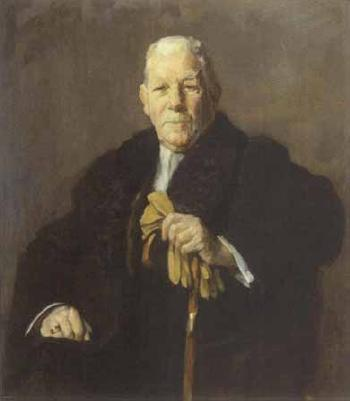
Christian Schmiegelow

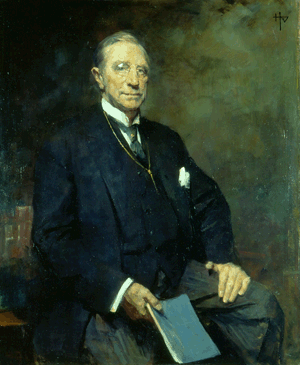
Emil Holm

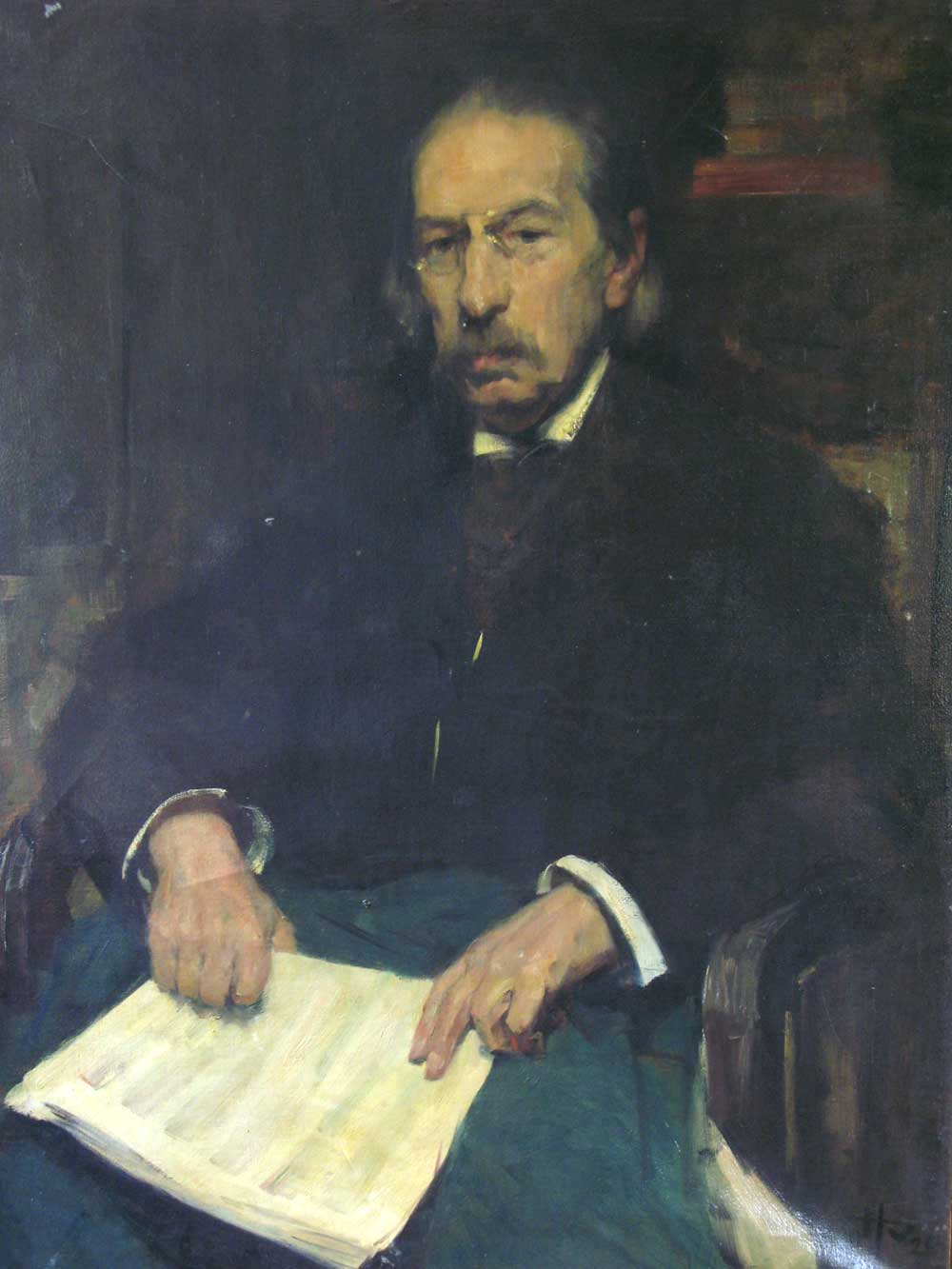
Victor Bendix

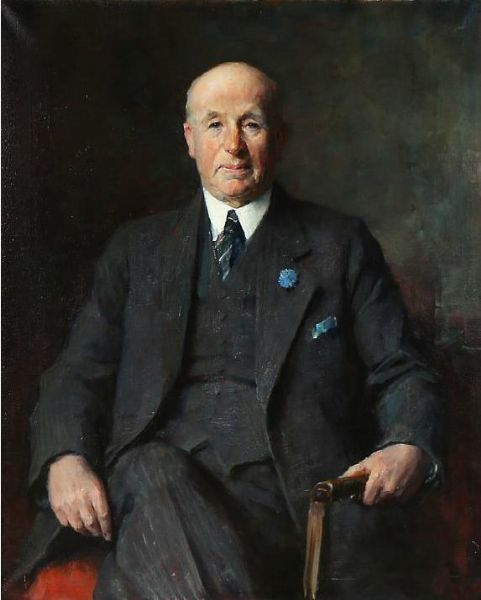
Gunnar Asgeir Sadolin

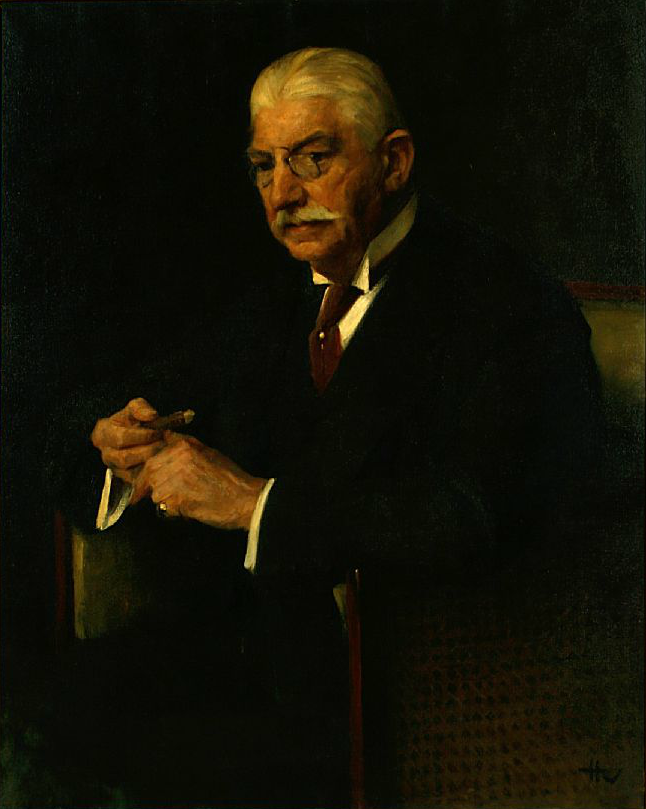
Carl Gammeltoft

== See also ==
- Art of Denmark
