= De Danske Sukkerfabrikker =

Danish sugar manufacturing company

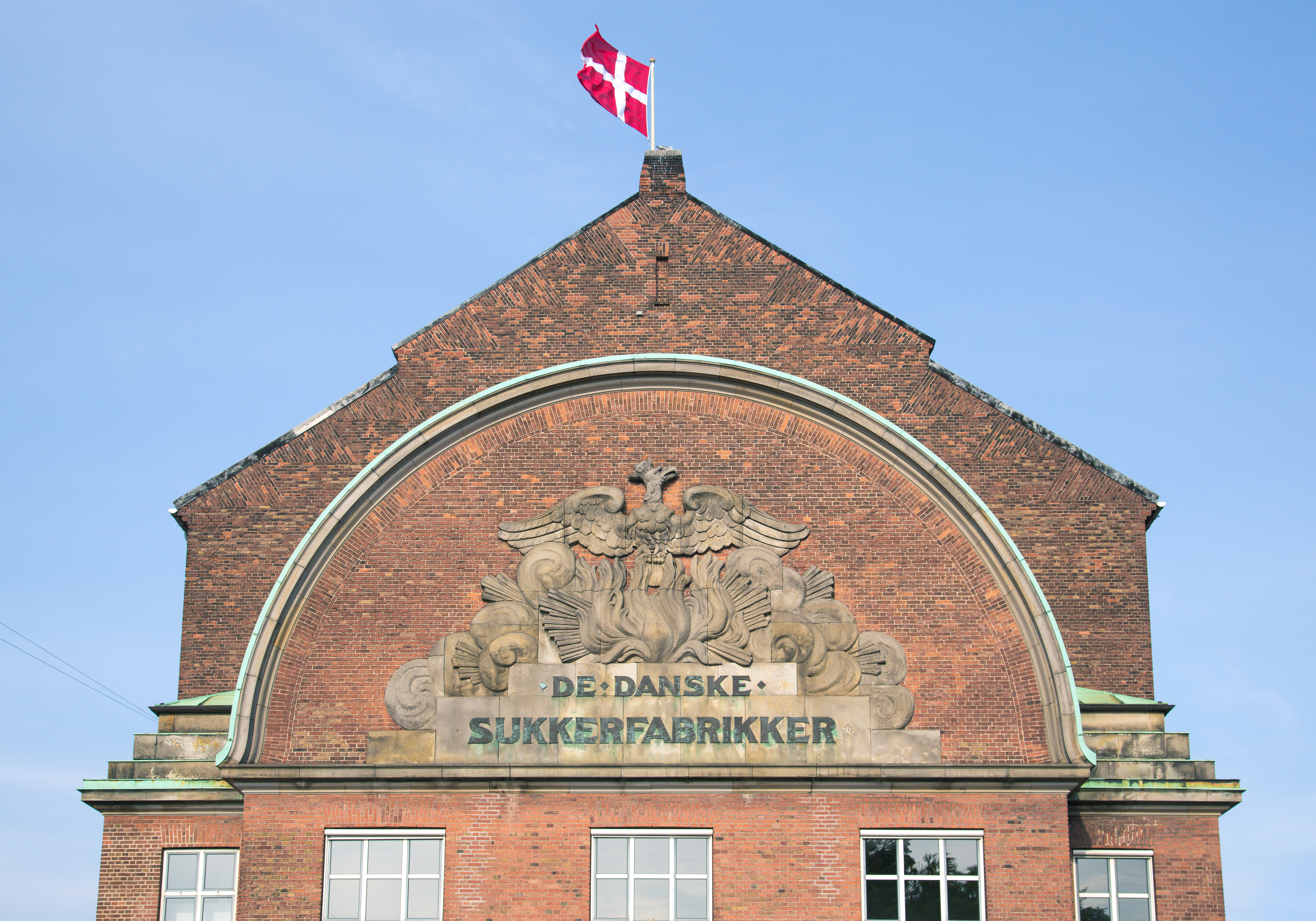
The company name seen on the gable of its former warehouse at Applebye Plads in Copenhagen

De Danske Sukkerfabrikker (lit. 'the Danish Sugar Factories') was a Danish sugar manufacturing company established in 1872 in Copenhagen, Denmark. It played a central role in the development of a thriving Danish sugar industry based on sugar beets from Lolland-Falster, Møn and Funen. The company merged with Danisco and De Danske Spritfabrikker in 1989. It then continued as Danisco Sugar Sector until 2011, when it was acquired by Nordzucker and renamed Nordic Sugar.

The Danish Sugar Museum in Nakskov contains an exhibition about the history of the company. A number of historic factories and warehouses have survived. These include a monumental warehouse at Applebys Plads in Copenhagen.

== History ==
=== Foundation ===
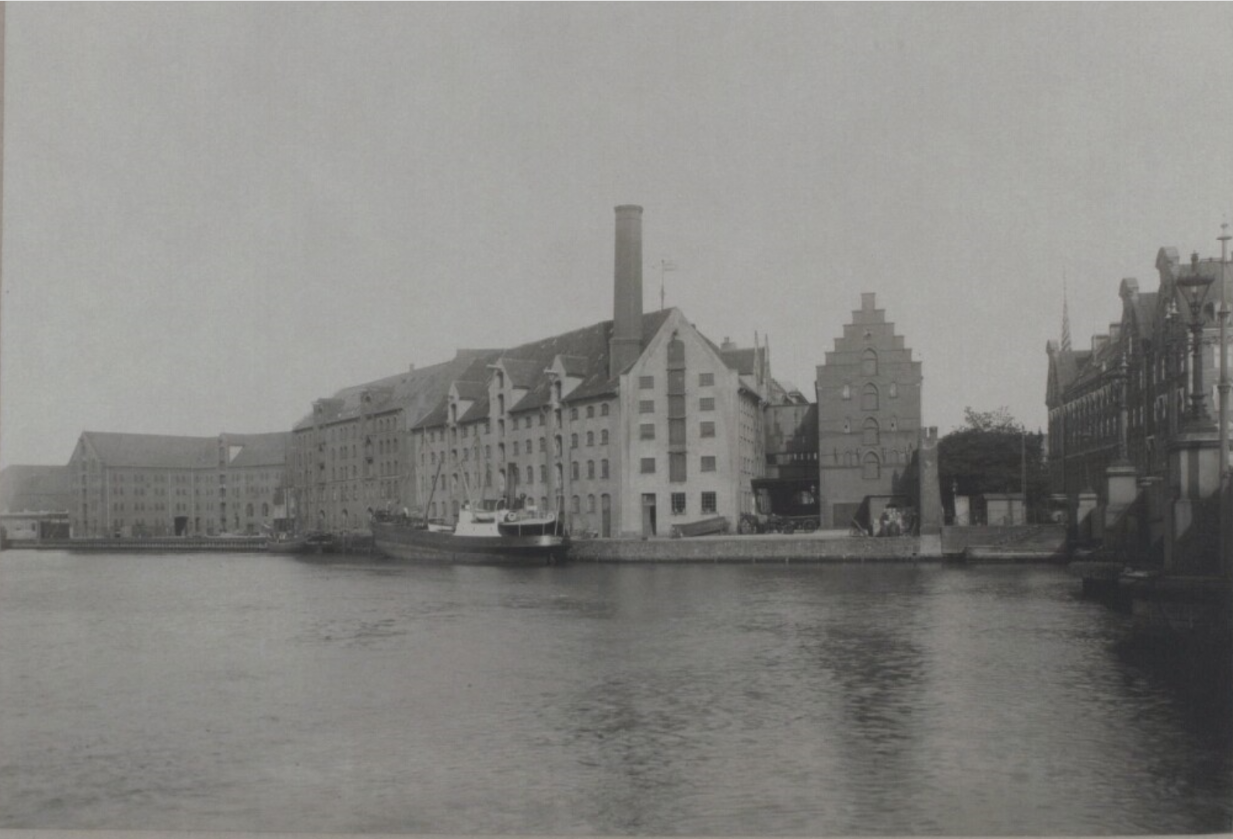
The now-demolished Phønix Sugar Refinery in Copenhagen

De Danske Sukkerfabrikker was founded at the initiative of Carl Frederik Tietgen on 20 April 1872. The newly established company acquired two existing sugar refineries in Copenhagen from Det kjøbenhavnske Skibsrederi, a subsidiary of H. Puggaard & Co. One of them was the Phønix Sugar Refinery (Rafinaderiet Phønix) on Slotsholmen (Slotsholmsgade/Christians Brygge) and the other was the Helsingørsgade Sugar Refinery, located in the former Helsingørsgade street, between Adelgade and Borgergade.

The first board consisted of Tietgen (chairman), Gustav Brock, E. J. Hvidt, Hans Peter Ingerslev, Tage Reedtz-Thott, Sehestedt-Juul. The company H. Puggaard & Co., the parent company of Det kjøbenhavnske Skibsrederi led by Rudolph Puggaard, was charged with handling the daily operations while Tietgen convinced the engineer Gustav Adolph Hagemann to join the company as chief technical officer. Puggaard was succeeded by Carl Gammeltoft as managing director of the company in 1881.

=== Raw sugar from the West Indies ===
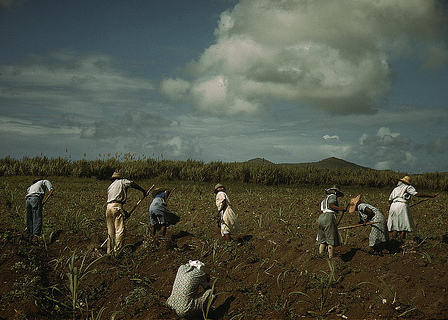
Sugar farmers in Bethlehem, Dec. 1941, Bethlehem, Saint Croix 1940s.

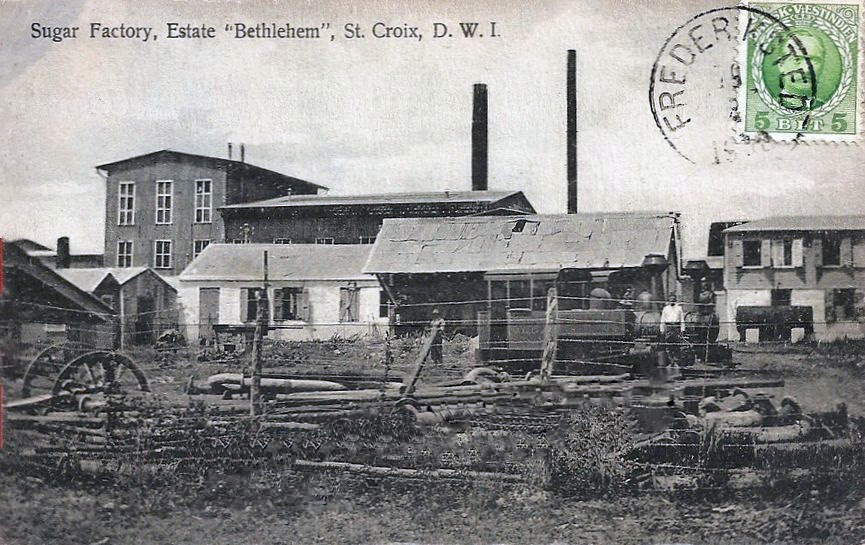
Sugar Factory, Estate 'Bethlehem', St. Croix, 1902.

The company was initially dependent on raw sugar from the Danish West Indies. Hagemann was sent to Saint Croix to reorganize the sugar cane industry. St. Croix Fællessukkerkogeri started operations in 1878 and the last technical challenges were solved when Hagemann visited St. Croix for the third time in 1879. 700 mm narrow gauge railway at Bethlehem Old Work, U.S. Virgin Islands, Estate Bethlehem’s Sugar Industry, St. Croix, US Virgin Islands.

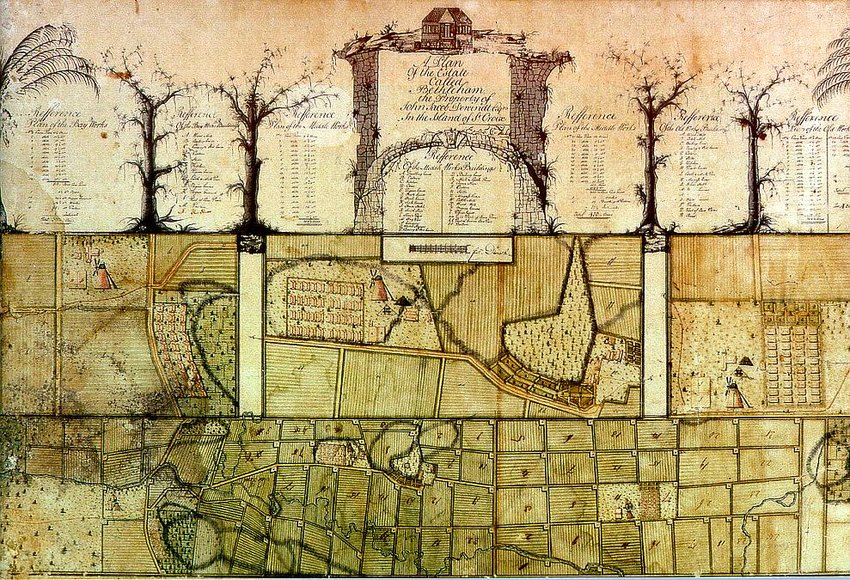
Estate Bethlehem on a map of 1779 by the military surveyor Frederik Christian von Meley.

=== A new focus on sugar beet ===
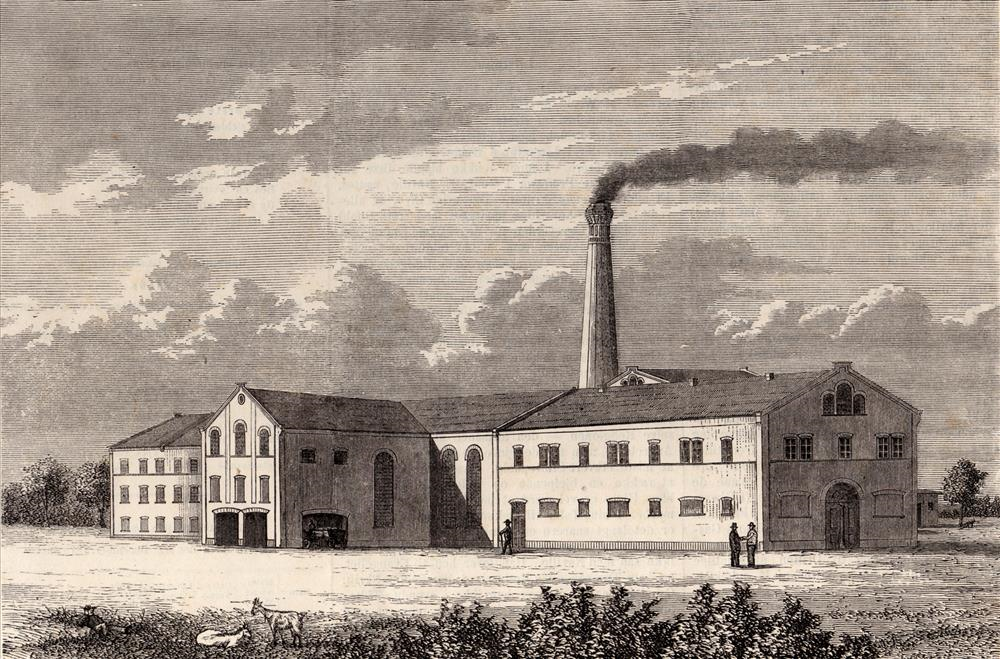
Højbygaard Sugar Factory

Since its foundation, De Danske Sukkerfabrikker invested heavily in developing a local sugar industry based on sugar beets from Funen, Lolland-Falster and Møn. The construction of a large new sugar factory in Odense began in 1872. The competing Højbygaard Sugar Factory at Holeby on Lolland was acquired in 1880. A sugar factory in Nakskov was constructed in 1882 and followed by two new sugar factories in Stege and Assens in 1884.

Lyngby Sugar Factory was acquired in 1903; Maribo Sugar Factory, founded just one year earlier, was acquired in 1908, and the Store Larsbjørnsstræde Sugar Refinery in Copenhagen was acquired in 1910.

The sugar refinery in Helsingørsgade was destroyed by fire in 1912. A new large sugar factory was then built on Applebys Plads. It also replaced the sugar refinery in Store Larsbjørnsstræde which closed in 1914.

A new sugar factory in Saxkøbing opened in 1910 and Sukkerfabrikken Vestsjælland (renamed Gørlev Sugar Factory) was acquired in 1934.

- Assens Sugar Factory (1884–2006) Assens Sukkerfabrik
- Gørlev Sugar Factory (1912–2000)
- Højbygaard Sugar Factory (1873–1960)
- Maribo Sugar Factory (1897–1962)
- Nakskov Sugar Factory (1882– ) Nakskov Sukkerfabrik
- Nykøbing sugar factory (1884– )
- Odense Sugar Factory (1873–1970)
- Sakskøbing Sugar Factory (1910–1991)
- Stege Sugar Factory (1884–1989) Stege Sukkerfabrik
- The Sugar Factory (Tranekær) (1804-1810) Sukkerfabrikken (Tranekær)

=== Merger ===
De Danske Sukkerfabrikker merged with Danisco (founded in 1934 by the Dansk Handels- og Industri Compagni, which was founded in 1923) and De Danske Spritfabrikker (founded in 1881).
