= Prosperity, U.S. Virgin Islands =

Coordinates: 17°43′34″N 64°52′56″W

Prosperity, United States Virgin Islands
- Village
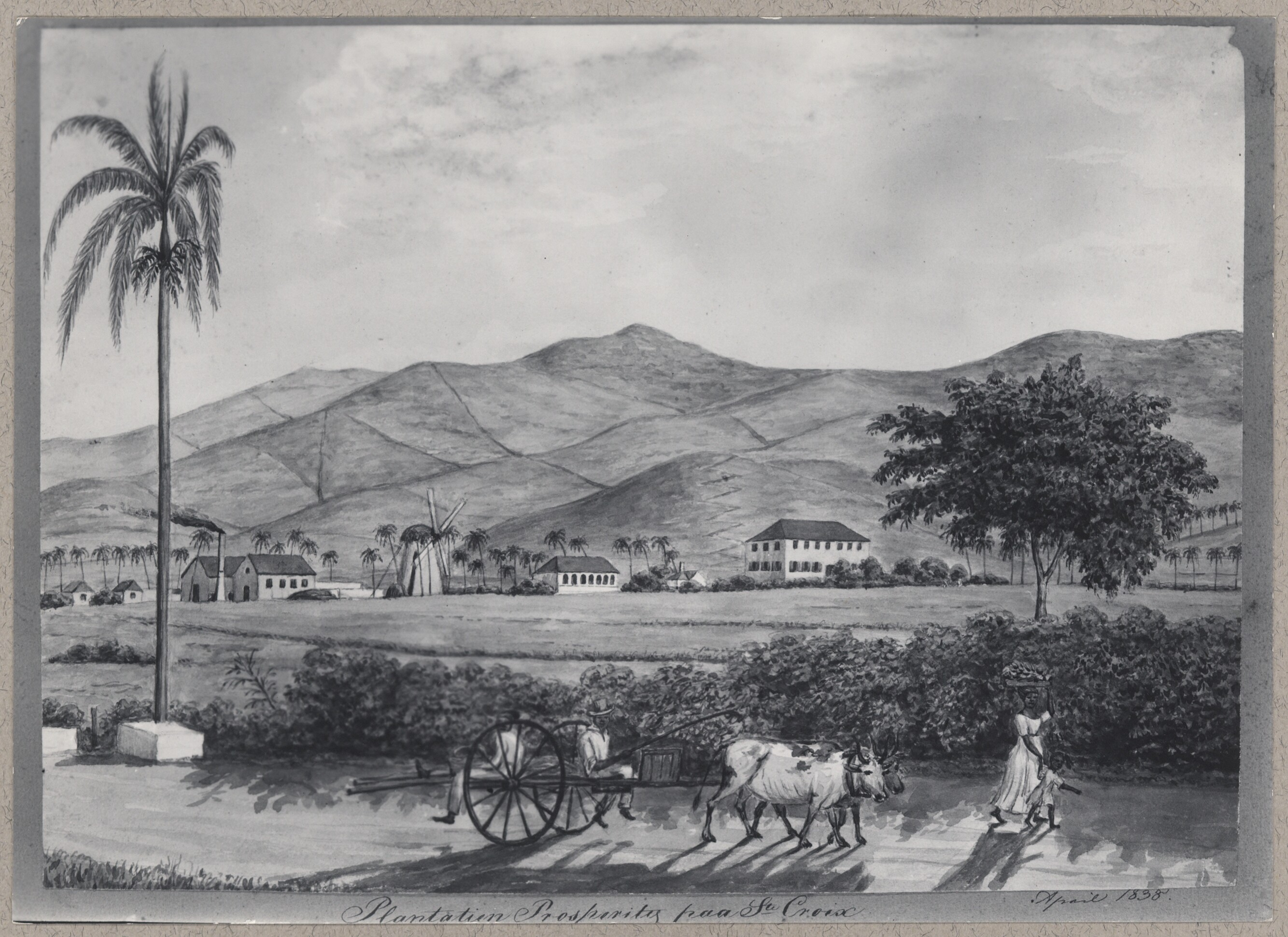
- Plantation Prosperity depicted by Frederik von Scholten in April 1939.
- Interactive map of Prosperity, United States Virgin Islands
- Country: United States Virgin Islands
- Island: Saint Croix
- Time zone: UTC-4 (AST)

Prosperity is a settlement and former sugar plantation on the island of Saint Croix in the United States Virgin Islands. Today it is a demonstration farm for new varieties of sugar cane.
