= Hans Peter Nielsen (politician) =

Danish politician (1852–1928)

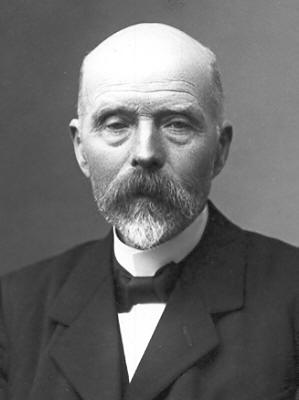

Personal details
- Born: 29 April 1852 Vejstrup, Denmark
- Died: 17 September 1928 (aged 76) Vejstrup, Denmark
- Occupation: Farmer, politician

Hans Peter Nielsen (29 April 1852 in Vejstrup – 17 September 1928 in Vejstrup) was a Danish farmer and politician.

Nielsen was the son of Niels Hansen (1817–1906) and Karen Hansdatter. His grandfather was Hans Christensen, also a farmer and politician. Nielsen received his education in a private school, followed by a year in 1869–1870 at Vejstrup College and then Gedved Seminarium. His studies were interrupted by military service at Odense.

In 1878 he married Gunhild Knudsen, daughter of jeweler Knudsen from Copenhagen, and between 1878 and 1885 they lived on a farm in Vejstrup. In December 1882 he became politically active with the Oure-Vejstrup Parish, of which he was a member for six years, the last three years as chairman. In 1892 he was elected to the Svendborg County Council as his father's successor.

In 1884, he became member of the Committee for Svendborg Nyborg railways, and later promoted to director and in 1903 to Executive Chairman. In 1897, he also became a member of the executive board of the Fyns Telefon Company at the request of Frederik Hey, who believed that the company should be owned by the county and urban municipalities. The same year, he succeeded his father as director of the Agricultural Bank of Fyn. In 1884, Nielsen also became part of financial division of Svendborg County, but had to abandon this post three years later due to political tensions.

On 1 January 1890 Nielsen co-founded a magazine of Svendborg County, Folkebladet for Svendborg Amt, which was a medium of moderate-left politics. In 1900 he was hired as director of fire insurance in Svendborg and held this post until his death in 1928. On 28 August 1908 he became Knight of the Order of the Dannebrog.
