= Cryolite =

Halide mineral

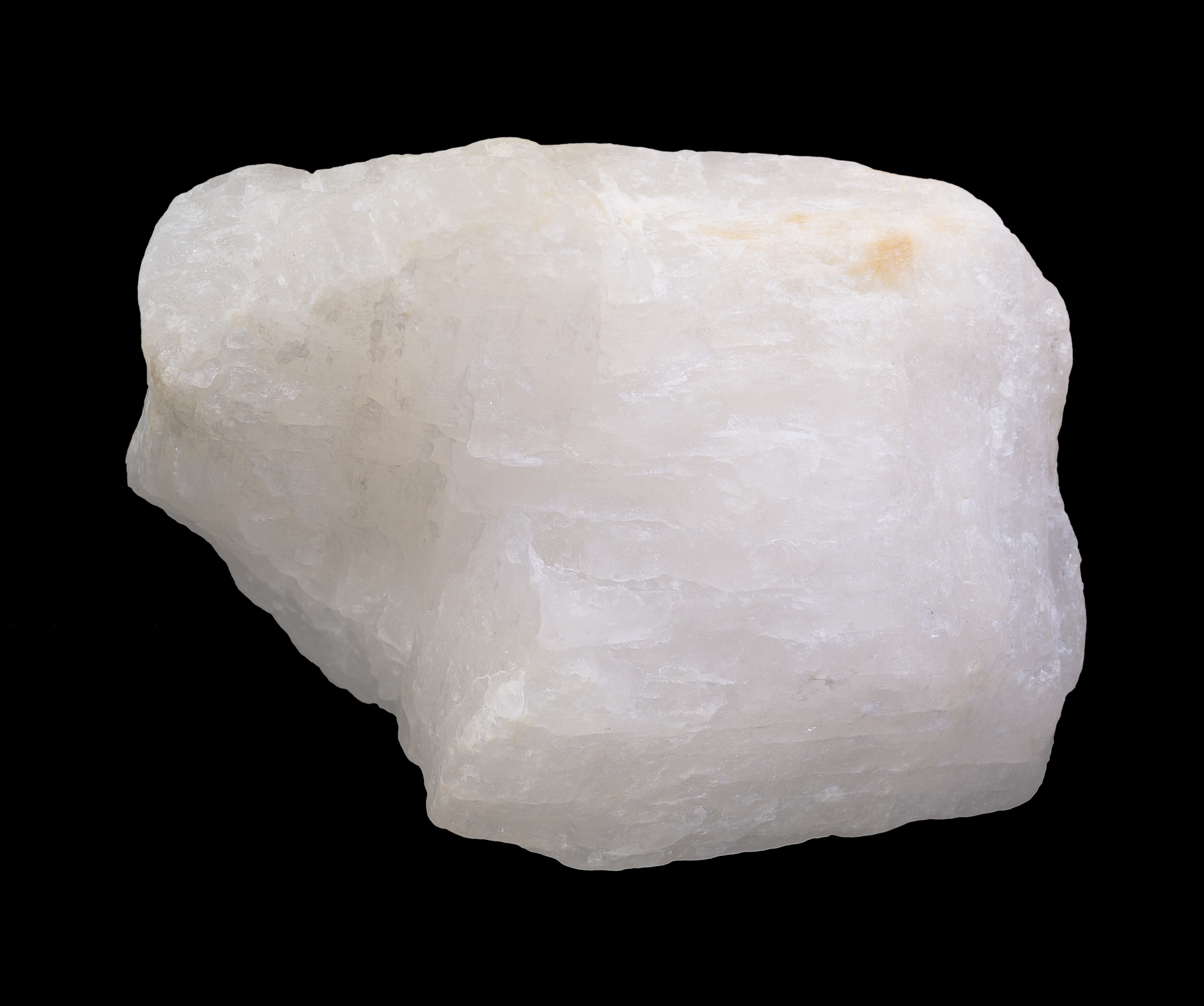
- Cryolite from Ivittuut, Greenland

General
- Category: Halide mineral
- Formula: Na_{3}AlF_{6}
- IMA symbol: Crl
- Strunz classification: 3.CB.15
- Dana classification: 11.6.1.1
- Crystal system: Monoclinic
- Crystal class: Prismatic (2/m) (same H-M symbol)
- Space group: P2_{1}/n
- Unit cell: a = 7.7564(3) Å, b = 5.5959(2) Å, c = 5.4024(2) Å; β = 90.18°; Z = 2

Identification
- Formula mass: 209.9 g mol^{−1}
- Color: Colorless to white, also brownish, reddish and rarely black
- Crystal habit: Usually massive, coarsely granular. The rare crystals are equant and pseudocubic.
- Twinning: Very common, often repeated or polysynthetic with simultaneous occurrence of several twin laws
- Cleavage: None observed
- Fracture: Uneven
- Tenacity: Brittle
- Mohs scale hardness: 2.5 to 3
- Luster: Vitreous to greasy, pearly on {001}
- Streak: White
- Diaphaneity: Transparent to translucent
- Specific gravity: 2.95 to 3.0.
- Optical properties: Biaxial (+)
- Refractive index: n_{α} = 1.3385–1.339, n_{β} = 1.3389–1.339, n_{γ} = 1.3396–1.34
- Birefringence: δ = 0.001
- 2V angle: 43°
- Dispersion: r < v
- Melting point: 1012 °C
- Solubility: Soluble in AlCl_{3} solution, soluble in H_{2}SO_{4} with the evolution of HF, which is poisonous. Insoluble in water.
- Other characteristics: Weakly thermoluminescent. Small clear fragments become nearly invisible when placed in water, since its refractive index is close to that of water. May fluoresce intense yellow under SWUV, with yellow phosphorescence, and pale yellow phosphorescence under LWUV. Not radioactive.

Cryolite (Na_{3}AlF_{6}, sodium hexafluoroaluminate) is a rare mineral identified with the once-large deposit at Ivittuut on the southwest coast of Greenland, mined commercially until 1987.

It is used in the reduction ("smelting") of aluminium, in pest control, and as a dye.

Due to the demand for sodium hexafluoroaluminate and the scarcity of naturally-ocurring cryolite, it is also produced synthetically.

== History ==
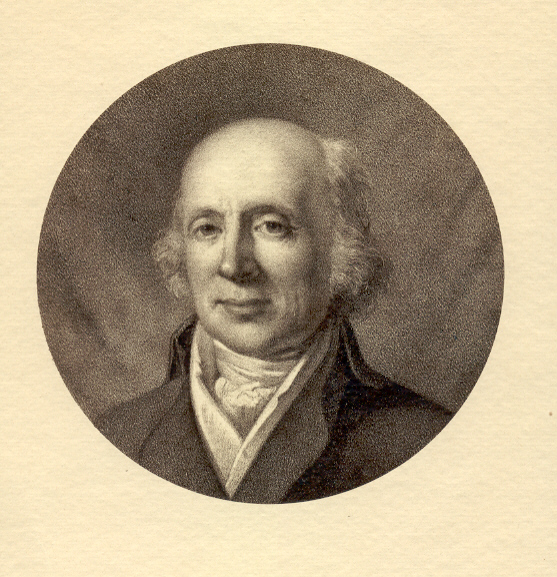
Peter Christian Abildgaard

Cryolite was first described in 1798 by Danish veterinarian and physician Peter Christian Abildgaard (1740–1801), from rock samples obtained from local Inuit who used the mineral for washing their hides; the actual source of the ore was later discovered in 1806 by the explorer Karl Ludwig Giesecke. who found the deposit at Ivigtut (old spelling) and nearby Arsuk Fjord, Southwest Greenland, where it was extracted by Øresund Chemical Industries. The name is derived from the Greek words cryos (Greek: κρύος, lit. 'frost'), and lithos (Greek: λίθος, lit. 'stone').

The Pennsylvania Salt Manufacturing Company used large amounts of cryolite to make caustic soda and fluorine compounds, including hydrofluoric acid at its Natrona, Pennsylvania, works, and at its integrated chemical plant in Cornwells Heights, Pennsylvania, during the 19th and 20th centuries.

It was historically used as an ore of aluminium and later in the electrolytic processing of the aluminium-rich oxide ore bauxite (itself a combination of aluminium oxide minerals such as gibbsite, boehmite and diaspore). The difficulty of separating aluminium from oxygen in the oxide ores was overcome by the use of cryolite as a flux to dissolve the oxide mineral(s).

Pure cryolite itself melts at 1012 °C (1285 K), and it can dissolve the aluminium oxides sufficiently well to allow easy extraction of the aluminium by electrolysis. Substantial energy is still needed for both heating the materials and the electrolysis, but it is much more energy-efficient than melting the oxides themselves. As natural cryolite is now too rare to be used for this purpose, synthetic sodium aluminium fluoride is produced from the common mineral fluorite.

In 1940 before entering World War II, the United States became involved with protecting the world's largest cryolite mine in Ivittuut, Greenland from falling into Nazi Germany's control.

In 1987 the main mining in Ivittuut was closed. According to economist Arindam Banerjee, exploitation of cryolite in Greenland contributed nearly 54 billion euros to Danish economy, though this claim has been strongly disputed.

== Source locations ==
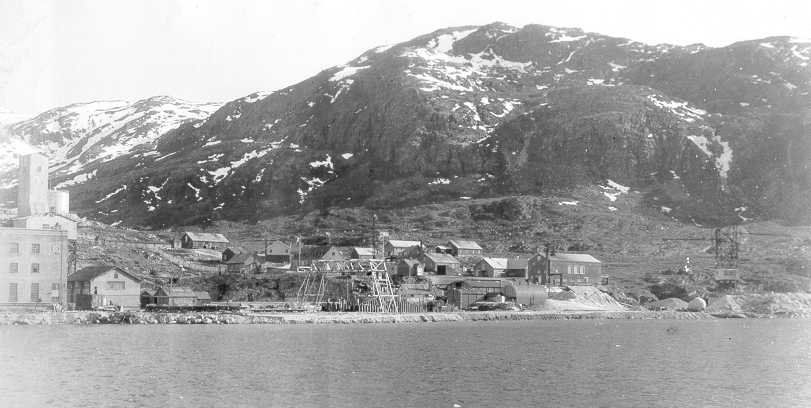
The cryolite mine at Ivigtut, Greenland, summer 1940

Besides Ivittuut, on the southwest coast of Greenland where cryolite was once found in commercial quantities, small deposits of cryolite have also been reported in some areas of Spain, at the foot of Pikes Peak in Colorado, Francon Quarry near Montreal in Quebec, Canada and also in Miass, Russia.

== Uses ==
Molten cryolite is used as a solvent for aluminium oxide (Al_{2}O_{3}) in the Hall–Héroult process, used in the refining of aluminium. It decreases the melting point of aluminium oxide from 2000–2500 °C to 900–1000 °C, and increases its conductivity thus making the extraction of aluminium more economical.

Cryolite is used as an insecticide and a pesticide. It is also used to give fireworks a yellow color. It is used in glass manufacturing as a "powerful opaliser."

== Physical properties ==
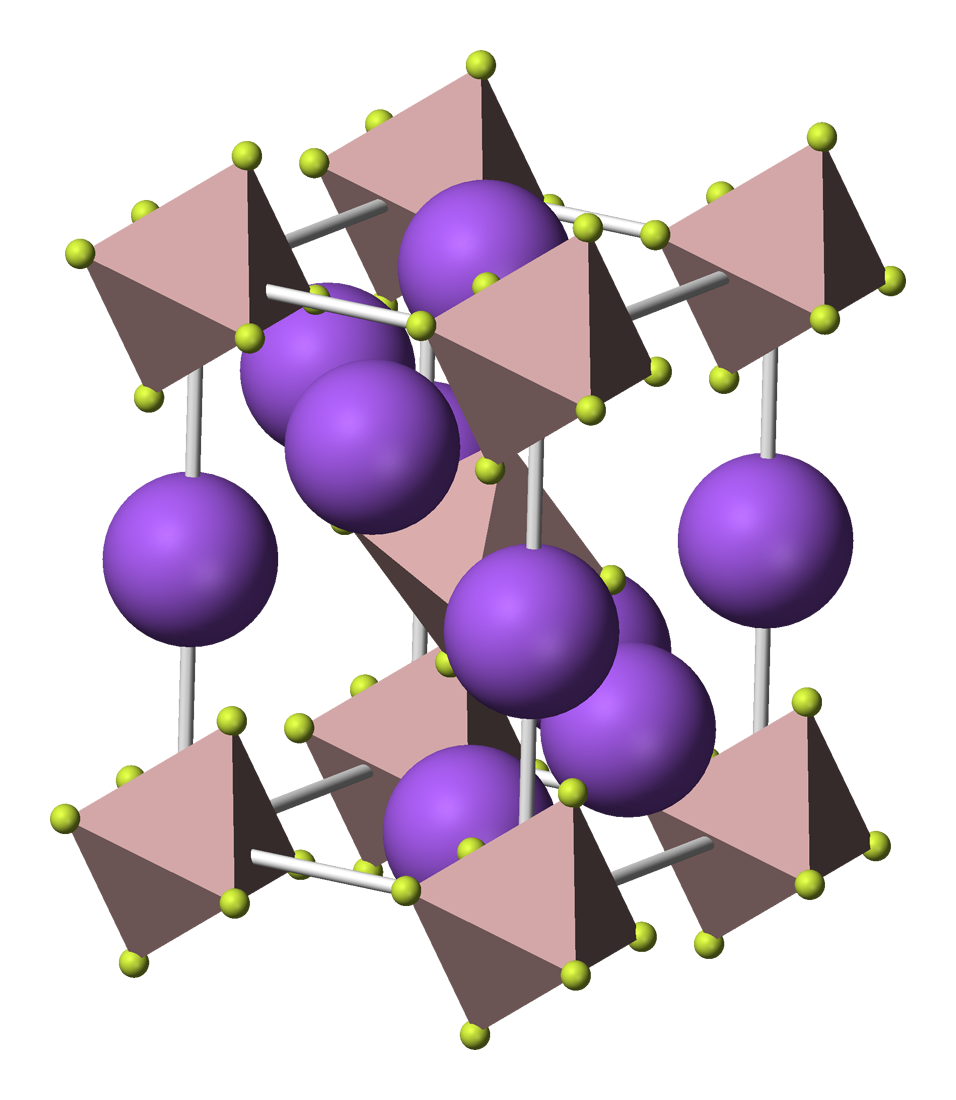
Cryolite's unit cell. Fluorine atoms (yellow) are arranged in octahedra around aluminium atoms (red). Sodium ions (purple) occupy the interstices between the octahedra.

Cryolite occurs as glassy, colorless, white-reddish to gray-black prismatic monoclinic crystals. It has a Mohs hardness of 2.5 to 3 and a specific gravity of about 2.95 to 3.0. It is translucent to transparent with a very low refractive index of about 1.34, which is very close to that of water; thus if immersed in water, cryolite becomes essentially invisible.
