= Vejstrup =

- Town
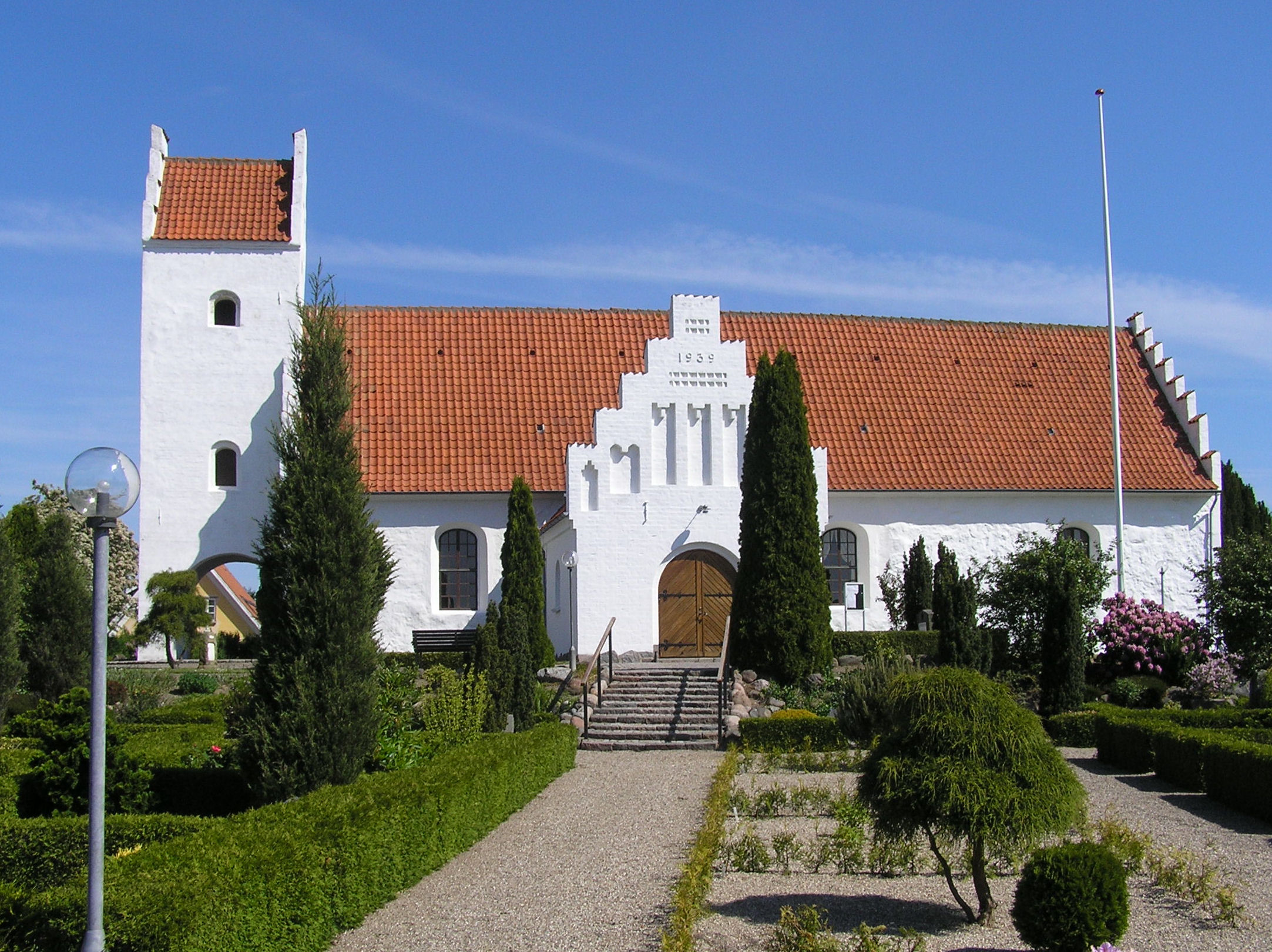
- Vejstrup Church

- Location in the Region of Southern Denmark
- Coordinates: 55°6′25″N 10°42′48″E
- Country: Denmark
- Region: Southern Denmark
- Municipality: Svendborg

Population (2026)
  - Total: 412
- Time zone: UTC+1 (CET)
  - Summer (DST): UTC+2 (CEST)

Vejstrup is a small town located on the island of Funen in south-central Denmark, in Svendborg Municipality. It is located 26 km south of Nyborg and 10 km northeast of Svendborg.

== Notable people ==
- Hans Peter Nielsen (1852 – 1928) a Danish farmer and politician
