= Bethlehem Old Work, U.S. Virgin Islands =

Bethlehem Old Work
- Village
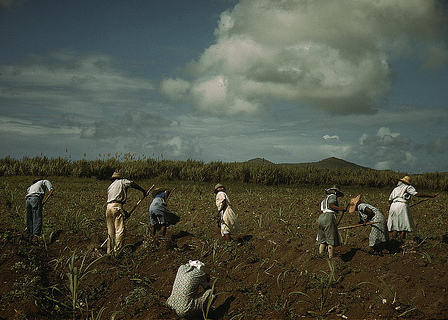
- Sugar farmers in Bethlehem, Dec. 1941

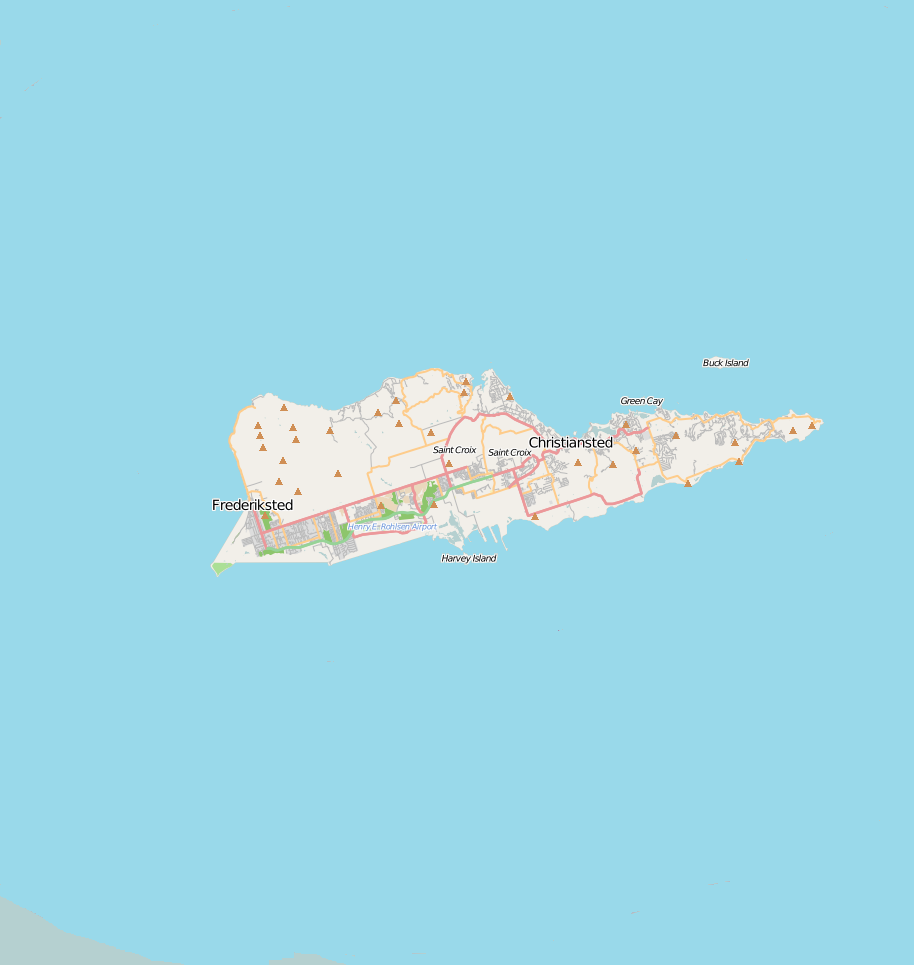
- Location in Saint Croix, United States Virgin Islands
- Coordinates: 17°43′53″N 64°47′38″W
- Country: United States Virgin Islands
- Island: Saint Croix
- Time zone: UTC-4 (AST)

Bethlehem Old Work is a settlement on the island of Saint Croix in the United States Virgin Islands. It was set-up as one of the first plantations in the 1730s, and operated as the last sugar plantation on the island until the Bethlehem Central Factory closed in 1966.

== Location ==
Bethlehem Old Works, also known as Lower Bethlehem, was part of the Estate Bethlehem in the flat center of St. Croix, where now the VIARNG armory is located along the Bethlehem Gut waterway, which had been called South Salt River in the colonial era. Other parts of the Estate were Bayworks (Fairplain) in the south and Middle Works (Upper Bethlehem) in the north.

== Name ==
The source of the name of Estate Bethlehem is unknown, but it was probably named after Bethlehem, Pennsylvania by the Moravians, who evangelized the Danish Virgin Islands since 1732 at a mission in Friedensfeld near Lower Bethlehem.

== History ==
The Danish West India Company, which often acted as an agent on behalf of the Danish Crown, purchased St. Croix from France in 1733. Prior to this deal, the settlement was labeled Baron on a French map of 1671.

The area that became known as Bethlehem was deeded to King Christian VI and the Queen in 1736, as it was flat and ideally suited for cultivation of sugar or cotton benefiting from the fresh water of the Bethlehem Gut. In 1739, King's Quarter was subdivided: Parts of it were sold to the Dutch governor of St. Eustatius Peter Heyliger and his brother Johannes, while four plots were retained by the King, until they were sold to the Heyligers in 1751. The first windmill was built at Bethlehem in the late 1760s.

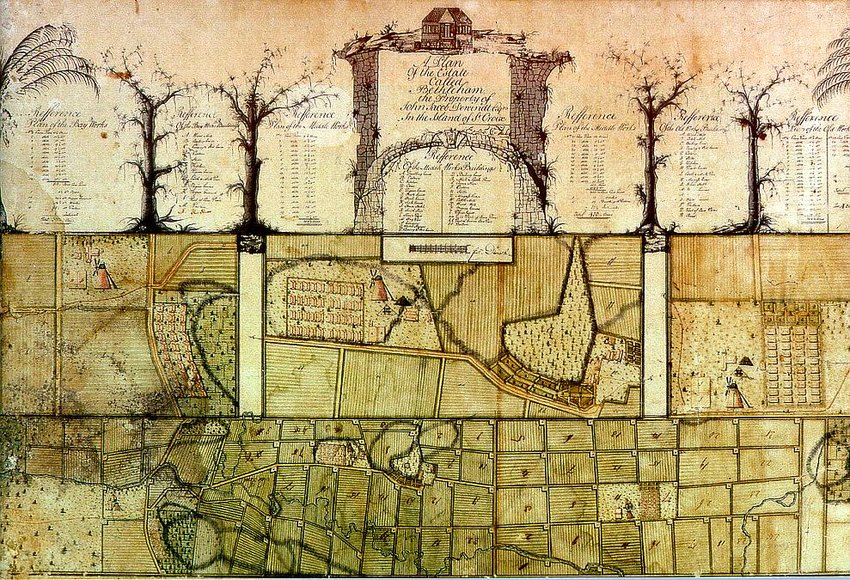
Estate Bethlehem on a map of 1779 by the military surveyor Frederik Christian von Meley

A map of 1779 by the military surveyor Frederik Christian von Meley shows Lower Bethlehem on the right as an eighteenth century Danish sugar plantation. The Old Works occupied 450 acres, and was divided into 27 variably sized plots. The slave village consisted of four rows of ten structures each, and the provision grounds occupied an acre and a half to the west of the village. Further south were the sugar mill and associated buildings for processing sugar cane.

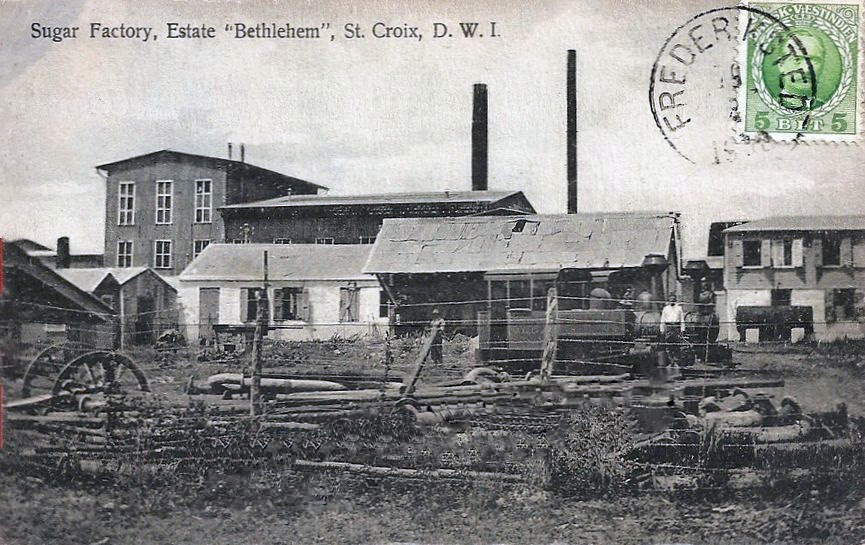
Sugar Factory, Estate 'Bethlehem', St. Croix, 1902

In the 1820s, Estate Bethlehem suffered from a drought, a hurricane and the drop in sugar prices, and were thus sold to Benjamin De Forest at an auction in 1831. In 1882, William H. Carson, a Danish investor, bought the estates at Bethlehem, Friedensburg and Jealousy and built a modern sugar factory at Lower Bethlehem, which used the vacuum pan process to refine the sugar. He sold Bethlehem to the Lachmann family in 1902 who built the Central Sugar Factory at Lower Bethlehem in 1903. It was connected by a narrow gauge steam railway to Bethlehem Middle Works and Friedensburg, which also belonged to the Lachmann family.

In 1917, the United States bought the Danish Virgin Islands. The Lachmanns continued to manage the Bethlehem works, employing approximately 2,000 employees out of a total population of about 15,000, until they sold the factory to the federal government in 1930 as a consequence the Great Depression. Subsequently, the old factory was demolished and a new sugar mill was built to replace it, which operated until 1966.

The land became the property of the Virgin Islands Government. Ruins of the Bethlehem Central Factory and many of the worker's residences are still standing, including the smokestack, which has become a prominent landmark of central St. Croix. Parts of the plantations were parceled off and sold for agricultural use, while others were used for building the new headquarters of the Virgin Islands Army National Guard.

== Literature ==
- U.S. Geological Survey Geographic Names Information System: Bethlehem Old Work, U.S. Virgin Islands
