= Frederik Christian von Meley =

Danish surveyor

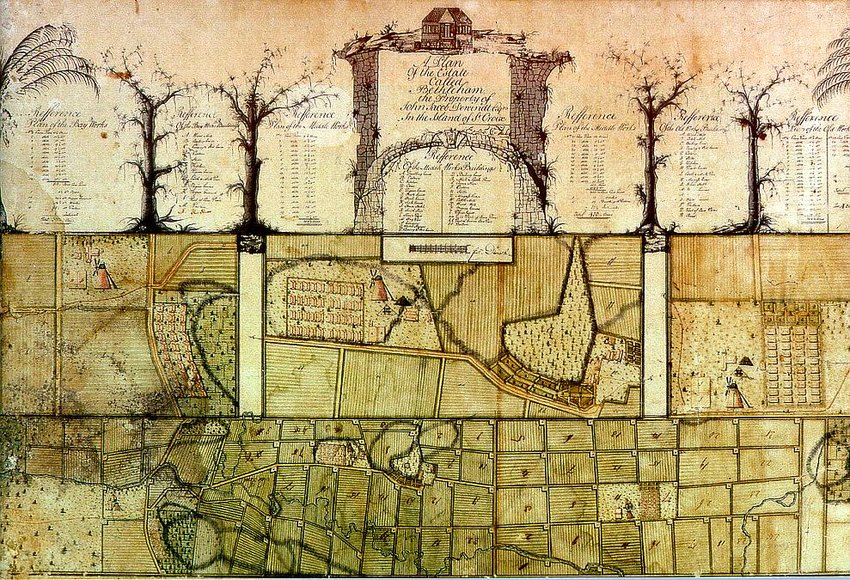
Estate Bethlehem on a map of 1779 by the military surveyor Frederik Christian von Meley

Frederik Christian von Meley (about 1749–1814) was a Danish army officer, administrator, and surveyor who settled on the island of Saint Croix in the Danish West Indies. He is noted for the quality of his maps, which give valuable information on the economy and society of the island in his time.

== Life ==
Born about 1749 in the Duchy of Holstein, he was commissioned into the Royal Danish Army and before 1776 was posted to Saint Croix. There he escaped bankruptcy in 1777, when he was living at Fiskergade 4 in Christiansted, and around 1780 became Deputy Customs Official in Christiansted. In 1788 he was living at 10 Hospital Street with his wife and three daughters, along with other dependants, and was the government's Comptroller and a Customs Official. Promoted to major in the Danish army, he also worked as a surveyor and cartographer. In 1803 he was living at Kirkegade 5 in Christiansted.

As government surveyor he surveyed disputed boundaries on the East End of Saint Croix, but this map is now lost. However two of his maps survive: one showing a town plan of Charlotte Amalie on Saint Thomas was made when the town was rebuilt after two destructive fires in the early 1800s, the other shows Estate Bethlehem on Saint Croix in 1779. This estate plan provides a very valuable insight in the layout of three parts of a large sugar plantation. In 1803 he drew up a design for cavalry stables that can be viewed in the Danish Royal Archives.

He died in Christiansted at the age of 64 on 19 February 1814, followed in 1815 by his second wife.

== Family ==
About 1775 he married Anna Elizabeth Leenhardt and they had five daughters, who all married:

- Adriane Marie, born 1776, in 1793 married the Reverend Andreas Joachim Brandt and had three children.
- Anna Marie, born 1777, in 1798 married Captain Johan Ludvig Heitmann and had eight children.
- Adriane Elisabeth, born 1786, in 1819 married Ulrich Christian Schnell Wedege and had three children.
- Anna Elisabeth, born about 1797, in 1817 married Peter Martin Henrik Wesselhoft and had one child.
- Adriane Louise, born 1800, in 1828 married Major Jacob Heitmann Gyllich, Knight of the Dannebrog, and had seven children.

After the death of his first wife, on 7 May 1803 he married Christiane Marie Elisabeth Møller, widow of Paul Braag and daughter of Jørgen Hansen Møller.
