= David Alter =

American inventor and scientist (1807–1881)

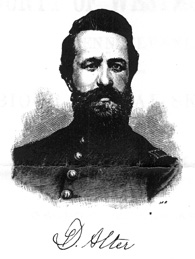
- Portrait of Alter, printed in the book History of the County of Westmoreland, Pennsylvania (1882)
- Born: December 3, 1807; Westmoreland County, Pennsylvania
- Died: September 18, 1881 (aged 73); Freeport, Pennsylvania
- Citizenship: American
- Known for: Inventions

David Alter (December 3, 1807 – September 18, 1881) was an American inventor and scientist of the 19th century. He was born in Westmoreland County, Pennsylvania and graduated from the Reformed Medical School in New York City. He had German and Swiss ancestry.

== Inventions ==
Alter is credited with having invented:

- 1836 - the electric telegraph, predating the Morse telegraph in 1837.
- 1840 - his electric buggy - the forerunner of the automobile.
- 1845 - a patented method to manufacture and purify bromine from salt wells, highly useful in the iron industry and displayed in the World's Fair of 1853 (see: Exhibition of the Industry of All Nations in New York City).
- 1854 - spectrum analysis, the idea that every element has its own emission spectrum: a breakthrough development in spectroscopy. The published article was: On Certain Physical Properties of Light Produced by the Combustion of Different Metals in an Electric Spark Refracted by a Prism. He included a chart of the colored lines or bands of twelve metals and paved the way by showing the spectral lines of brass corresponded to copper and zinc.
- 1855 - an expansion of spectrum analysis to include the optical properties of gas. These discoveries were later implemented and included by Gustav Kirchhoff and Robert Bunsen in the Three Laws of Spectroscopy.
- 1858 - a patented method to extract oil from coal and shale, along with a partner Samuel Hill. Their invention sped manufacturing, but was replaced by technology in a few years.
- An electric clock.
- A short range type of telephone - forerunner of the Graham Bell telephone.

== Biography ==
David Alter (1807–1881) was a doctor, scientist, and inventor, son of John Alter and Eleanor Sheetz. He began as a physician and scientist in Elderton, Pennsylvania in the 1830s. Alter married Laura Rowley, and they settled in Elderton.

In 1836, Alter invented the electric telegraph, one year before the popular Morse telegraph was invented. He rigged the telegraph between his house and his barn. He was interviewed about the discovery going unobserved by other inventors and said: "I may say that there is no connection at all between the telegraph of Morse and others and that of myself...Professor Morse most probably never heard of me or my Elderton telegraph."

Alter obtained medical schooling at the Reformed Medical College in New York City (debated on the dates), and at the Cincinnati Medical School (1841–1842).

Alter settled in Freeport, Pennsylvania about 1837. His first wife Laura died in 1842, and several years later he married her sister, Amanda Rowley. He had a total of eleven children. He manufactured bromine near his home, manned a weather station, worked as a physician, and was one of the first daguerreotype photographers of the town of Freeport.

Inventions while in Freeport: "In the great Pittsburgh Fire of 1845, he found a shard of melted glass that gave him the idea of the light spectrum. He went on to discover Spectral Analysis in 1853. He also invented and patented a method of manufacturing Bromine from salt wells in 1845, that was highly useful in the iron industry and was put on display in the World's fair." Alter resided in Freeport until his death in 1881, aged 73.
