= Pennsalt Historic District =

Historic district in Pennsylvania, United States

- U.S. National Register of Historic Places
- U.S. Historic district
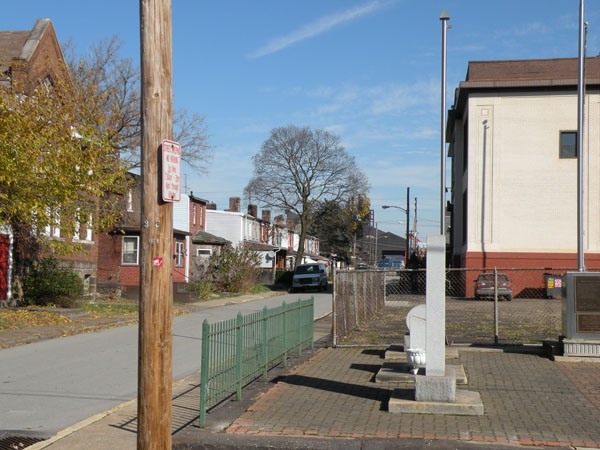

- Location within Pennsylvania Location within the United States
- Location: Roughly bounded by Federal, Penn, and Pond Streets, and Philadelphia and Blue Ridge Avenues, in Natrona, Pennsylvania
- Coordinates: 40°36′52.9″N 79°43′16.72″W
- Built: 1850–1924
- Architect: Pennsalt Co.
- Architectural style: Gothic Revival, Greek Revival
- NRHP reference No.: 85001571
- Added to NRHP: July 18, 1985

Pennsalt Historic District (also known as Pennsalt Company Houses) is a historic district in Natrona, Pennsylvania.

According to the Library of Congress, the Pennsalt Historic District, is "an early and architecturally intact collection of housing built by the Pennsylvania Salt Manufacturing Company," and "is a significant example of a western Pennsylvania company town of the mid to late 19th century."

== History ==
The area was originally built as a company town by the Pennsylvania Salt Manufacturing Company during the 1850s. According to The Pittsburgh Press, one hundred and fifty homes were built for Pennsalt employees between 1850 and 1880. Some were one-story frame cottages, others were two-story brick rowhouses. A company town from the time that Pennsalt arrived in Natrona in 1850 until the company left roughly a century later, it is an "approximately six-block area that runs parallel to the Allegheny River."

It was listed on the National Register of Historic Places on July 18, 1985.

In 2001, debate ensued when commissioners from the community of Harrison deemed one of the structures in the historic district as unsafe and too expensive to restore. After securing federal funds to pay for razing the Old Natrona Store, they were initially prevented from proceeding with the demolition by officials employed by the Pennsylvania Historical and Museum Commission (PHMC), who felt that other historic buildings in Pennsylvania that had been in worse condition had been saved and that this historic store should be preserved because it was "one of the few remaining structures from the town's early days as a center for the salt industry" in what was "one of the oldest company towns in the state." According to the Pittsburgh Post-Gazette, "Parts of the three-story brick building [were] still solid, but the roof [had] collapsed, along with the two floors beneath it. Bricks near the top of the building [were] loose, and parts of the building [had] shifted and settled" by October of that year. An agreement was reached in November of that year between Harrison officials, the Allegheny County Department of Development, and the PHMC which allowed Harrison officials to tear the building down after the Old Natrona Store was photographed and its history officially documented.
