= Carl Frederik Tietgen =

Danish financier and industrialist (1829–1901)

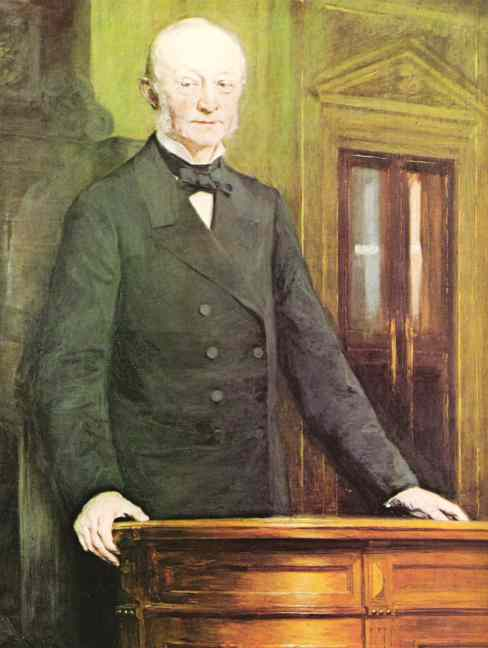
- Tietgen painted by P. S. Krøyer in 1892
- Born: 19 March 1829; Odense, Denmark
- Died: 19 October 1901 (aged 72); Copenhagen, Denmark
- Resting place: Graveyard at Lyngby Church
- Occupations: Industrialist, real estate developer
- Known for: Foundation of numerous companies Completion of Frederik's Church

Carl Frederik Tietgen (19 March 1829 – 19 October 1901) was a Danish financier and industrialist. He played an important role in the industrialisation of Denmark as the founder of numerous prominent Danish companies, many of which are still in operation today. Tietgen notably formed conglomerates, thus several of Tietgen's companies attained monopoly-like status, cementing their durability.

Tietgen was a dedicated Grundtvigian, and financed the completion of the Marble Church at his own expense.

== Early life and career ==
Tietgen was born on 19 March 1829 in Odense, the son of a social club manager catering to the local bourgeoisie. He helped his family out at the club throughout his childhood. After finishing his commercial apprenticeship, he worked in the United Kingdom for five years, and settled in Manchester, England. During that time he also traveled to northern Germany, Norway and Sweden. In the United Kingdom Tietgen gained experience in private banking, which at that time in Denmark was an industry still in its infancy.

== Career at Privatbanken ==
Upon returning to Denmark Tietgen founded a wholesale business, C.F. Tietgen & Co., at Copenhagen’s Amagertorv in 1855, and later relocated it to Gammeltorv Market. In spite of the office impressive locations, the business was a modest sole proprietorship, dealing primarily as an agent between business connections in Manchester and Copenhagen. In 1857 after his involvement as curator in a bankruptcy had demonstrated a remarkable eye for economy and strategic thinking, he was invited to join the management of Privatbanken which under him developed into Denmark's first investment bank.

In the span of four decades as head of Privatbanken, Tietgen created and consolidated a large number of companies, and gained control of major companies in several industrial sectors.

In the transportation industry Tietgen developed several railroads, capitalized Burmeister & Wain as well as Svitzer in 1872. He created Det Forenede Dampskibs-Selskab as a merger of several smaller operators and in 1880 founded Thingvalla Line.

Tietgen created several companies in the telegraph and telecommunications sector. He founded Det Store Nordiske Telegraf-Selskab in 1868, and with the arrival of the telephone KTAS was founded in 1880.

In 1872 Tietgen formed De Danske Sukkerfabrikker as a merger of several sugar refineries. In 1873 followed the cofounding of the Tuborg brewery and the consolidation of several smaller coffee substitute companies forming De Danske Cikoriefabrikker. In 1881 several smaller distillers were merged to form De Danske Spritfabrikker and in 1891 the merger of several independent breweries formed De Forenede Bryggerier.

In 1869 Tietgen cofounded Banque de Paris with a group of European bankers, which in 1872 merged to form Paribas.

Tietgen was a major force and a European pioneer in industrial consolidation. Tietgen would merge several competing companies in a given industry, creating large publicly traded stock companies. Privatbanken would become a major shareholder in the new company, as would a circle of business associates and Tietgen himself.

He retired from Privatbanken in 1896, after suffering a stroke in Paris in 1894.

== Founded companies ==
- GN Store Nord Det Store Nordiske Telegraf-Selskab (1868)

The companies founded or co-founded by Tietgen include:

- De Danske Sukkerfabrikker (1872), today part of Danisco
- B&W (1872)
- Thingvalla Line (1879)
- De Danske Spritfabrikker (1881), today part of Danisco
- KTAS (1882)
- Det Forenede Dampskibs-Selskab (1866)
- Tuborg Brewery

== Philanthropist ==
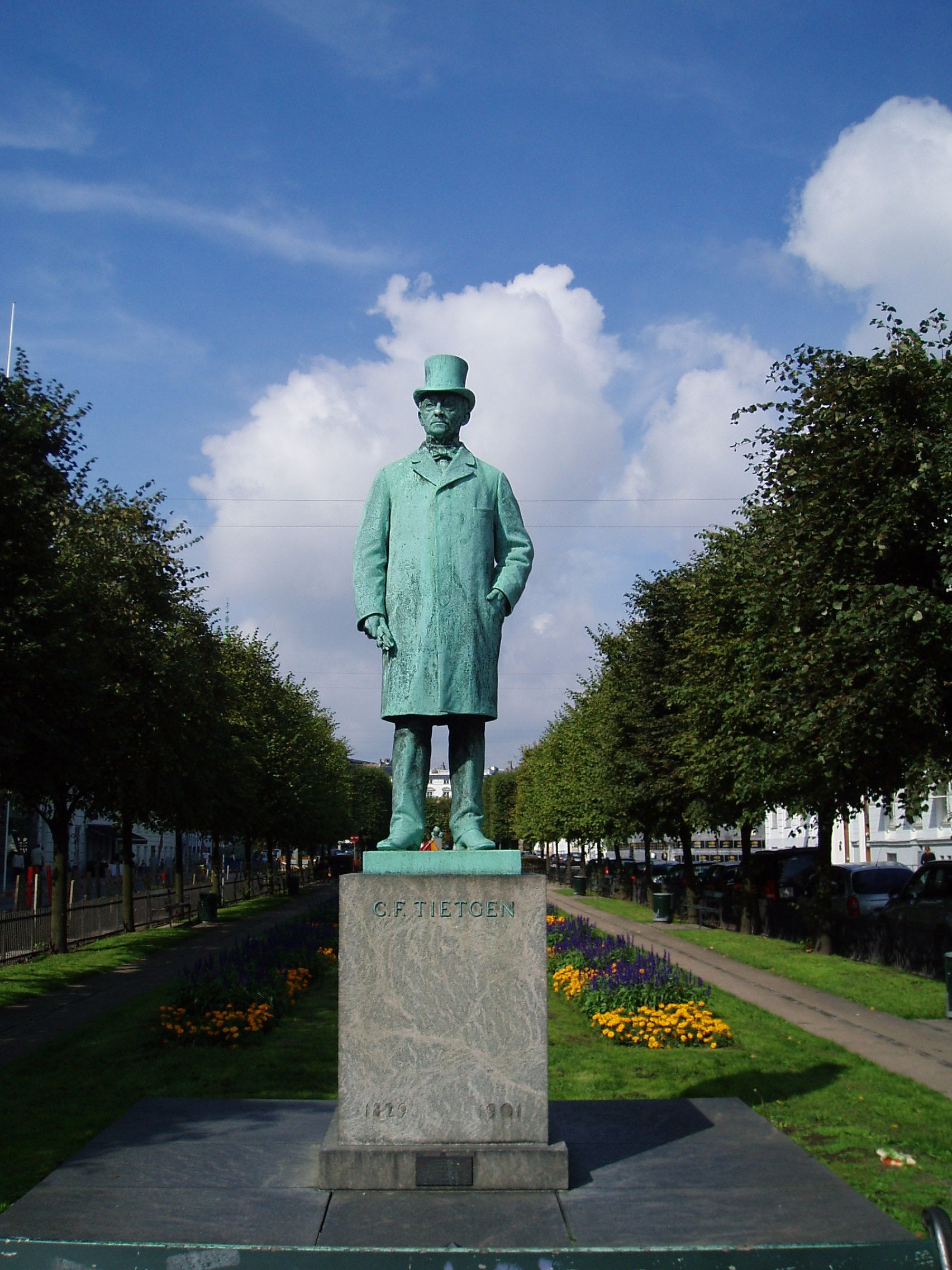
Statue of Tietgen at Sankt Annæ Plads in Copenhagen

Tietgen was also to some extent a philanthropist, notably paying for the completion of Marble Church. He also built Taarbæk Church on the Øresund coast north of Copenhagen.

== Personal life ==
Tietgen married 19-year-old Laura Charlotte Jørgensen on 8 August 1855 in Vejstrup on the island of Funen.

Tietgen suffered partial paralysis following a minor brain hemorrhage in 1894. He was weakened for the last years of his life, causing him to retire from most of his positions. Tietgen died in the evening of 19 October 1901 and a memorial ceremony took place at the Marble Church on 23 October. He was buried in Lyngby on 29 October 1901.

== See also ==
- Gustav Adolph Hagemann
