= Gummow =

Gummow may refer to

- Gummow (surname)
- Gummow's Shop, a hamlet in Cornwall, England
- C.R. Gummow Public School, a school in Cobourg, Ontario, Canada
