= Belloite =

General
- Category: Halide
- Formula: Cu(OH)Cl
- IMA symbol: BII
- Strunz classification: 03.DA.10b Halides
- Crystal system: Monoclinic
- Crystal class: 2/m - Prismatic
- Space group: P2_{1}/a
- Unit cell: a = 5.552 Å, b = 6.668 Å c = 6.124 Å; β= 115.00°; Z = 4

Identification
- Formula mass: 116.01gm
- Color: Yellowish-Green, Olive-Green
- Crystal habit: Encrustations
- Mohs scale hardness: 1-2
- Luster: Vitreous(Glassy)
- Streak: Yellowish-Green
- Diaphaneity: Transparent to Translucent
- Specific gravity: 3.74 g/cm^{3} to 3.79 g/cm^{3}
- Density: 3.79 g/cm^{3}
- Pleochroism: Weak
- Dispersion: r > v medium
- Ultraviolet fluorescence: None

Belloite is a halide mineral first discovered in the Rio Tinto Mine in Sierra Gorda, Antofagasta, Chile in 1998. Belloite has the ideal chemical formula of Cu(OH)Cl. The mineral has been approved by the Commission on New Minerals and Mineral Names, IMA, to be named belloite, after Andrés de Jesús María y José Bello López, the founder of the Universidad de Chile. Samples of belloite are preserved in the collection of the Mineralogical Museum in Hamburg, Germany.

== Occurrence ==
Belloite is commonly found alongside nitratine and paratacamite. It is unstable in the presence of water or in humid climates and will convert to botallackite and atacamite through the process of hydrolysis. Belloite is only stable in desert regions. It occurs in crystalline incrustations in its host rock. The most common host rocks for belloite are quartz, feldspar, or tourmaline. Belloite forms in tiny crystals, with an average size of 0.03 millimeters, at its largest reaching up to 0.1 millimeters in size.

== Physical properties ==
Belloite is a yellow-green to olive-green, with a yellowish green streak. It exhibits a hardness between 1 and 2 on the Mohs hardness scale. Belloite occurs as incrustations or aggregates in a host rock. Its crystals are characterized by the {100}, {001}, {052}, {112}, and {121}, faces. The measured density is 3.79 g/cm^{3}.

== Optical properties ==
Belloite is biaxial positive, which means it will refract light along two axes, and is calculated to 1.85. It is translucent to transparent mineral with a vitreous or glassy luster. Belloite has weak pale yellowish green pleochroism.

== Chemical properties ==
Belloite is a halide with space group P2_{1}/a. The empirical chemical formula for Belloite is Cu_{l.05}(OH)_{1.00}O_{0.1}Cl_{0.90} or more ideally Cu(OH)Cl. It is very close to the chemical formula of Anthonyite. Belloite is closely related to botallackite and atacamite as it will convert to them in the presence of humidity.

== Chemical composition ==
Oxide	wt%	Range
CuO	68.84	62.35-71.54
Cl	26.35	23.02-29.24
H_{2}O	7.47	7.42-7.51
Total	102.66	92.79-108.29

== X-ray crystallography ==
Belloite is in the monoclinic crystal system, with space group P2_{1}/a. The X-ray powder pattern was found using the Phillips X'Pert powder diffractometer and Cukα radiation. They were then refined with the least squares from the indexed powder data. Unit cell dimensions of: a = 5.333(3)Å, b = 6.668(2)Å, c = 6.124(2)Å; β= 115.00°; Z=4. The volume of unit cell = 205.47Å^{3}.

== See also ==
List of Minerals
