= Dicopper chloride trihydroxide =

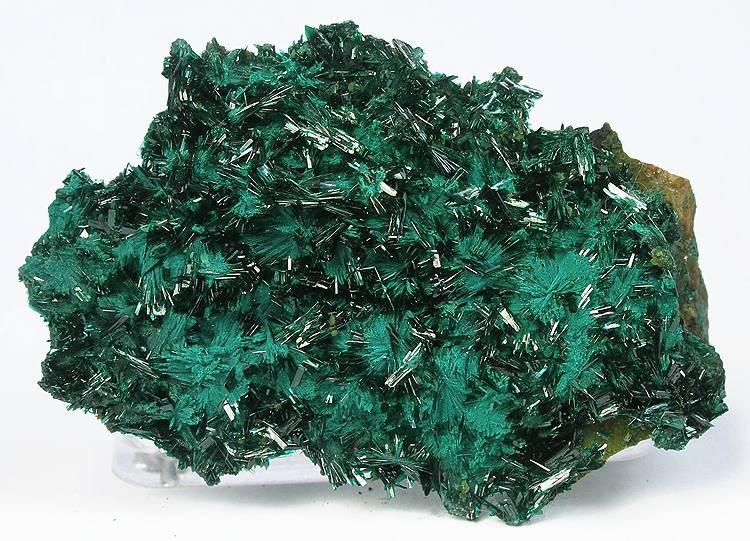

Names
- IUPAC name Dicopper(II) chloride trihydroxide
- Preferred IUPAC name Copper trihydroxyl chloride
- Other names tribasic copper chloride, TBCC, copper trihydroxyl chloride, copper hydroxychloride

Identifiers
CAS Number	1332-65-6
3D model (JSmol)	Interactive image
ChemSpider	10142932
ECHA InfoCard	100.014.158
EC Number	215-572-9
PubChem CID	11969527
UNII	76712031PG
CompTox Dashboard (EPA)	DTXSID6034475
- InChI: InChI=1S/ClH.2Cu.3H2O/h1H;;;3*1H2/q;2*+2;;;/p-4 Key: SKQUUKNCBWILCD-UHFFFAOYSA-J
- SMILES: [OH-].[OH-].[OH-].[Cl-].[Cu+2].[Cu+2]

Properties
Chemical formula	Cu_{2}(OH)_{3}Cl
Molar mass	213.56 g·mol^{−1}
Appearance	Green crystalline solid
Density	3.5 g/cm^{3}
Melting point	250 °C; 482 °F; 523 K
Solubility in water	Insoluble in water (pH 6.9 measured by EPA method SW846-9045)
Solubility	Insoluble in organic solvents

Structure
Crystal structure	Atacamite: orthorhombic; Paratacamite: rhombohedral; Clinoatacamite: monoclinic; Botallackite: monoclinic
Coordination geometry	Distorted octahedral

Hazards
NFPA 704 (fire diamond)	1 0 0
Flash point	Non-flammable
- NIOSH (US health exposure limits)
PEL (Permissible)	TWA 1 mg/m^{3} (as Cu)
REL (Recommended)	TWA 1 mg/m^{3} (as Cu)
IDLH (Immediate danger)	TWA 100 mg/m^{3} (as Cu)
- Safety data sheet (SDS)
- Except where otherwise noted, data are given for materials in their standard state (at 25 °C [77 °F], 100 kPa). verify (what is ?) Infobox references

Dicopper chloride trihydroxide is the inorganic compound with chemical formula Cu_{2}(OH)_{3}Cl. It is more often referred to as copper oxychloride. This greenish substance is encountered as the minerals atacamite, paratacamite, and botallackite. Similar materials are assigned to green solids formed upon corrosion of various copper objects.

== Industrial production ==
=== Air oxidation of copper(I) chloride in brine solution ===
Cu_{2}(OH)_{3}Cl can be prepared by air oxidation of CuCl in brine solution. The CuCl solution is usually made by the reduction of CuCl_{2} solutions over copper metal. A CuCl_{2} solution with concentrated brine is contacted with copper metal until the Cu(II) is completely reduced. The resulting CuCl is then heated to 60–90 °C (140–194 °F) and aerated to effect the oxidation and hydrolysis. The oxidation reaction can be performed with or without the copper metal. The precipitated product is separated and the mother liquor containing CuCl_{2} and NaCl, is recycled back to the process:

CuCl_{2} + Cu + 2 NaCl → 2 NaCuCl_{2}
12 NaCuCl_{2} + 3 O_{2} + 6 H_{2}O → 4 Cu_{2}(OH)_{3}Cl + 4 CuCl_{2} + 12 NaCl

The product from this process is of fine particle with size of 1–5 μm and is usable as an agricultural fungicide.

A stable, free-flowing, non-dusty green powder with typical particle size of 30–100 μm has been used in preparation of uniform animal feed mixtures.

=== Recycling from etchant waste ===
There are two types of spent etching solutions from printed circuit board manufacturing operations: an acidic cupric chloride solution (CuCl_{2}/HCl), and an alkaline tetraamminedichloridocopper(II) solution (Cu(NH_{3})_{4}Cl_{2}). Cu_{2}(OH)_{3}Cl is generated by neutralization of either one of these two solutions (acidic or alkaline pathway), or by combination of these two solutions, a self-neutralization reaction.

In the acidic pathway, the cupric chloride solution can be neutralized with caustic soda, or ammonia, lime, or other base.

In the alkaline pathway, cuprammine chloride solution can be neutralized with HCl or other available acidic solutions:

2 [Cu(NH_{3})_{4}Cl_{2}] + 5 HCl + 3 H_{2}O → Cu_{2}(OH)_{3}Cl + 8 [NH_{4}]Cl

More efficiently, the two spent etching solutions are combined under mild acidic conditions, one neutralizing the other, to produce higher yield of Cu_{2}(OH)_{3}Cl:

3 [Cu(NH_{3})_{4}Cl_{2}] + 5 CuCl_{2} + 12 H_{2}O → 4 Cu_{2}(OH)_{3}Cl + 12 [NH_{4}]Cl

The production is operated continuously. Product with good particle size is produced and can be easily separated. After rinsing with water and drying, a free-flowing, green crystalline solid with typical particle size of 30–100 μm is obtained. The product from this process is α-Cu_{2}(OH)_{3}Cl. Variation from controlled reaction conditions can produce β-Cu_{2}(OH)_{3}Cl, which is undesirable as it undergoes caking in storage.

This process is used to manufacture thousands of tons of Cu_{2}(OH)_{3}Cl every year.

== Applications ==
=== As an agriculture fungicide ===
Fine Cu_{2}(OH)_{3}Cl has been used as a fungicidal spray on tea, orange, grape, rubber, coffee, cardamom, and cotton. It has also been used in aerial sprays on rubber for control of phytophthora attack on leaves.

=== As a pigment ===
Basic copper chloride has some use as a pigment and as a colorant for glass and ceramics. It was widely used as a coloring agent in wall painting, manuscript illumination, and other paintings by ancient people. It was also used in cosmetics by ancient Egyptians.

=== In pyrotechnics ===
Cu_{2}(OH)_{3}Cl has been used as a blue/green coloring agents in pyrotechnics.

=== As a catalyst ===
Cu_{2}(OH)_{3}Cl has been used in the preparation of catalysts and as a catalyst in organic synthesis for chlorination and/or oxidation.

Cu_{2}(OH)_{3}Cl has been shown to be a catalyst in the chlorination of ethylene.

Atacamite and paratacamite crystal forms of Cu_{2}(OH)_{3}Cl have been found to be active species in supported CuCl_{2} catalyst systems for the oxidative carbonylation of methanol to dimethyl carbonate. A number of supported Cu_{2}(OH)_{3}Cl catalysts have also been prepared and studied in such conversion. Dimethyl carbonate is an environmentally benign chemical product and unique intermediate with versatile chemical reactivity.

Cu_{2}(OH)_{3}Cl has been identified as a new catalytically active material for the partial oxidation of n-butane to maleic anhydride.

A mixture of ultrafine powder CuO/Cu_{2}(OH)_{3}Cl has been shown to be good in photo-catalytic decolorization of dyes, such as amido black, and indigo carmine.

=== As a feed supplement ===
Copper is one of the most critically important of the trace minerals that are essential elements in numerous enzymes that support metabolic functions in most organisms. Since the early 1900s, copper has routinely been added to animal feedstuffs to support good health and normal development. Starting in the 1950s, there was increasing focus on the issue of bioavailability of trace mineral supplements which led to copper sulfate pentahydrate becoming the predominant source. Because of its high water solubility, and thus hygroscopicity, CuSO_{4} leads to destructive reactions in feed mixtures. These are notoriously destructive in hot, humid climates. Recognition that basic copper chloride would reduce feed stability problems led to issuance of patents on the use of the compound as a nutritional source.

Subsequently, animal feeding studies revealed that the alpha crystal form of basic copper chloride has a rate of chemical reactivity that is well matched to biological processes. The strength of the bonds holding copper in the alpha crystal polymorphs could prevent undesirable, anti-nutritive interactions with other feed ingredients while delivering controlled amounts of copper throughout the active zones in the digestive tract of an animal.

Success in producing alpha basic copper chloride on a large scale allowed for the widespread application of basic copper chloride in the feed thereby supplying the copper requirements of all major livestock groups. This form of the compound has proven to be particularly suitable as a commercial feed supplement for use in livestock and aquaculture due to its inherent chemical and physical characteristics. Compared to copper sulfate, the alpha crystal form of basic copper chloride provides many benefits including improved feed stability, less oxidative destruction of vitamins and other essential feed ingredients; superior blending in feed mixtures, and reduced handing costs. It has been widely used in feed formulations for most species, including chickens, turkeys, pigs, beef and dairy cattle, horses, pets, aquaculture and exotic zoo animals.

== Natural occurrence ==
Cu_{2}(OH)_{3}Cl occurs as natural minerals in four polymorphic crystal forms: atacamite, paratacamite, clinoatacamite, and botallackite. Atacamite is orthorhombic, paratacamite is rhombohedral, and the other two polymorphs are monoclinic. Atacamite and paratacamite are common secondary minerals in areas of copper mineralization and frequently form as corrosion products of Cu-bearing metals.

The most common Cu_{2}(OH)_{3}Cl polymorph is atacamite. It is an oxidation product of other copper minerals, especially under arid, saline conditions. It was found in fumarolic deposits, and a weathering product of sulfides in subsea black smoker deposits. It was named for the Atacama Desert in Chile. Its color varies from blackish to emerald green. It is the sugar-like coating of dark green glistening crystals found on many bronze objects from Egypt and Mesopotamia.

It has also been found in living systems such as the jaws of the marine bloodworm Glycera dibranchiata. The stability of atacamite is evidenced by its ability to endure dynamic regimes in its natural geologic environment.

Paratacamite is another Cu_{2}(OH)_{3}Cl polymorph that was named for the Atacama Desert in Chile. It has been identified in the powdery light-green corrosion product that forms on a copper or bronze surface – at times in corrosion pustules. It can be distinguished from atacamite by the rhombohedral shape of its crystals.

Botallackite is the least stable of the four Cu_{2}(OH)_{3}Cl polymorphs. It is pale bluish-green in color. This rare mineral was first found, and later identified, in the Botallack Mine in Cornwall, England. It is also a rare corrosion product on archaeological finds. For instance, it was identified on an Egyptian statue of Bastet.

The fourth polymorph of Cu_{2}(OH)_{3}Cl family is clinoatacamite. It was found and identified around in Chuquicamata, Chile in 1996. It was named in allusion to its monoclinic morphology and relationship to atacamite. It too is pale green but has monoclinic crystals. Clinoatacamite can be easily confused with the closely related paratacamite. It is believed that clinoatacamite should replace most previously reported occurrences of paratacamite in the conservation literature.

=== Structure of naturally occurring forms ===
Atacamite is orthorhombic, space group Pnma, with two crystallographically independent Copper and Oxygen atoms of hydroxyl groups in the asymmetric unit. Both Cu atoms display characteristically Jahn-Teller distorted octahedral (4+2) coordination geometry: each Cu is bonded to four nearest OH groups with Cu-OH distance of 2.01 Å; in addition, one of Cu atoms is bonded to two Cl atoms (at 2.76 Å) to form a [Cu(OH)_{4}Cl_{2}] octahedron, and the other Cu atom is bonded to one Cl atom (at 2.75 Å) and a distant OH group (at 2.36 Å) to form a [Cu(OH)_{5}Cl] octahedron. The two different types of octahedron are edge-linked to form a three-dimensional framework with the [Cu(OH)_{5}Cl] octahedron cross-linking the [Cu(OH)_{4}Cl_{2}] octahedron layers parallel to (110) (Figure 1).

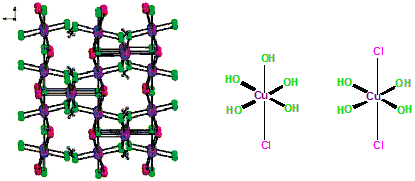
Figure 1. Cu coordination and bonding in atacamite

Botallackite crystallizes in monoclinic with space group P2_{1}/m. Like in atacamite, there are two different types of Cu coordination geometries: Jahn-Teller distorted octahedral [Cu(OH)_{4}Cl_{2}] and [Cu(OH)_{5}Cl]. But these octahedra assemble in different ways. Each octahedron shares six edges with surrounding octahedra, forming a two-dimensional sheet-type structure parallel to (100). The adjacent sheets are held together by hydrogen bonding between the hydroxyl oxygen atoms of one sheet and the opposing chlorine atoms in the other sheets. The resulting weak bonding between the sheets accounts for the perfect (100) cleavage and the typical platy habit of botallackite (Figure 2).

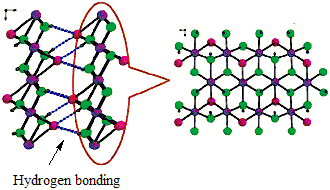
Figure 2. Cu coordination and bonding in botallackite

Paratacamite is rhombohedral, space group R3̅. It has a well-developed substructure with a’=a/2, c’=c, apparent space group R3̅m. There are four crystallographically independent Cu atoms in the asymmetric unit. The Cu atoms display three different types of octahedral coordination geometries. Three quarters of the Cu atoms are coordinated to four near OH groups and two distant Cl atoms, giving the expected (4+2) configuration [Cu(OH)_{4}Cl_{2}]. Three sixteenths of the Cu atoms are bonded to two near OH groups at 1.93 Å and four stretched OH groups at 2.20 Å to form an axially compressed (2+4) octahedral [Cu(OH)_{6}], and the remaining one sixteenth of the Cu atoms are bonded to six equivalent OH groups at 2.12 Å to form a regular octahedral [Cu(OH)_{6}]. The Jahn-Teller distorted [Cu(OH)_{4}Cl_{2}] octahedra share the edges and form partially occupied layers parallel to (001), and the compressed and regular [Cu(OH)_{6}] octahedra cross-link the adjacent [Cu(OH)_{4}Cl_{2}] octahedral layers to form a three-dimensional framework. The existence of the regular octahedral [Cu(OH)_{6}] is unusual, and it has been shown that partial substitution of Zn or Ni for Copper at this special site (3b) is necessary to stabilize paratacamite structure at ambient temperature. Due to the high symmetry of the special position, only about 2 wt% Zn is necessary to stabilize the rhombohedral structure. In fact, most of paratacamite crystals studied contain significant amounts of Zn or Ni (> 2 wt%) (Figure 3).

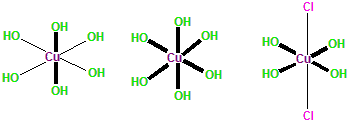
Figure 3. Cu coordination and bonding in paratacamite

Clinoatacamite is monoclinic, space group P2_{1}/m. The structure is very close to that of paratacamite. But the [Cu(OH)_{6}] octahedron is Jahn-Teller distorted. The Jahn-Teller distorted [Cu(OH)_{4}Cl_{2}] octahedra share the edges to form partially occupied layers parallel to (101). This layer is topologically the same as that in mica. Adjacent layers of octahedra are offset, such that vacant sites in one sheet align with occupied sites in the neighboring sheet. The [Cu(OH)_{6}] octahedra link the layers to form a 3-dimensional network (Figure 4).

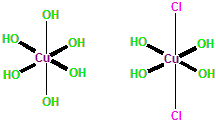
Figure 4. Cu coordination and bonding in clinoatacamite

Thermodynamic data based on the free energy of formation indicates that the order of stability of these polymorphs is clinoatacamite>atacamite> botallackite. Spectroscopic studies show that the strength of hydrogen bonding in these polymorphs is in the order paratacamite >atacamite> botallackite. Studies on the formation of basic copper chloride indicate botallackite is a key intermediate and crystallizes first under most conditions; subsequent recrystallization of botallackite to atacamite or paratacamite depends on the nature of reaction medium.
