= Trevaunance Cove =

Bay in Cornwall, United Kingdom

Coordinates: 50°19′18″N 5°12′08″W

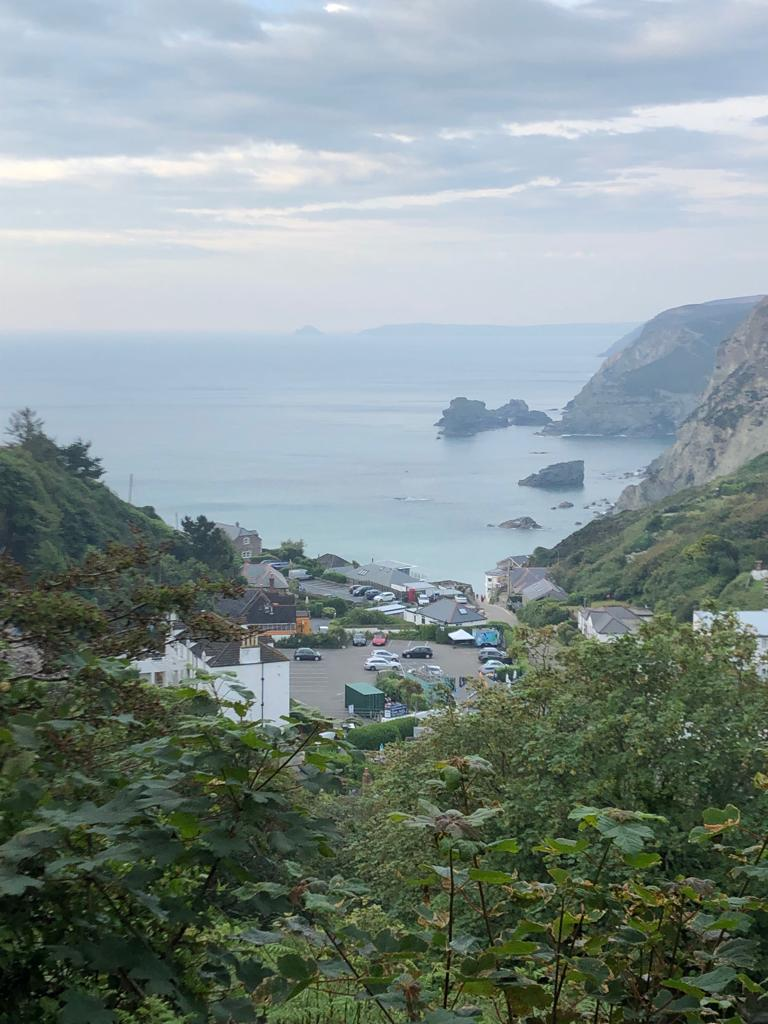
Trevaunance Cove

Trevaunance Cove is a small bay on the north Cornish coast and a residential area of St Agnes, Cornwall, England, United Kingdom. In the 18th and 19th centuries it was a busy harbour despite storms often destroying the quay. The South West Coast Path passes over the coastal slope to the north.

== Geography ==
Trevaunance Cove is on the north Cornish coast and is sheltered to the west by a headland but is open to sea and wind from the north and north-east. The cove is linked to St Agnes by road and footpaths through Travaunance Coombe. To the east, within 500 m, is Trevellas Porth and the Blue Hill mines, which are within the St Agnes Mining District in the Cornwall and West Devon Mining Landscape, UNESCO World Heritage Site.

The cove is of national importance for its geology, because it is part of a classical site for granite mineralisation and two ore-bearing mineral veins can be seen in the cliff. It is listed in the Geological Conservation Review and is a Site of Special Scientific Interest (SSSI). It is also within the St Agnes heritage coast and the Cornwall Area of Outstanding Natural Beauty.

== History ==
There used to be a small market which does not appear on any charter, although it was said to have been held from time immemorial for all wares and provisions except corn. A local land-owner, Mr Tonkin was given the right for a weekly market and two fairs via a Queen's patent in 1706. It was revoked following a petition from the inhabitants of Truro. The market survived and was still being held on Thursdays in 1838.

The Tonkin family attempted to create a harbour in the cove in 1632 and again in 1684. A third attempt in 1699 was made with the assistant of the engineer Henry Winstanley, who died in 1703 on the Eddystone Lighthouse. His harbour was destroyed by a violent storm in 1705. Five years later, at a cost of £6,000, Mr Tonkin built foundations of imported Lyas stone from Aberddaw, south Wales which was laid in hot lime. Following further damage and erosion, by 1794 a ″jetty pier″ of local ″moorstone″ was built costing £10,000, with the expenses being covered by a company of gentlemen which traded in coal, lime, slate, etc.
