= Wheal Prosper =

Disused tin mine in Cornwall, England

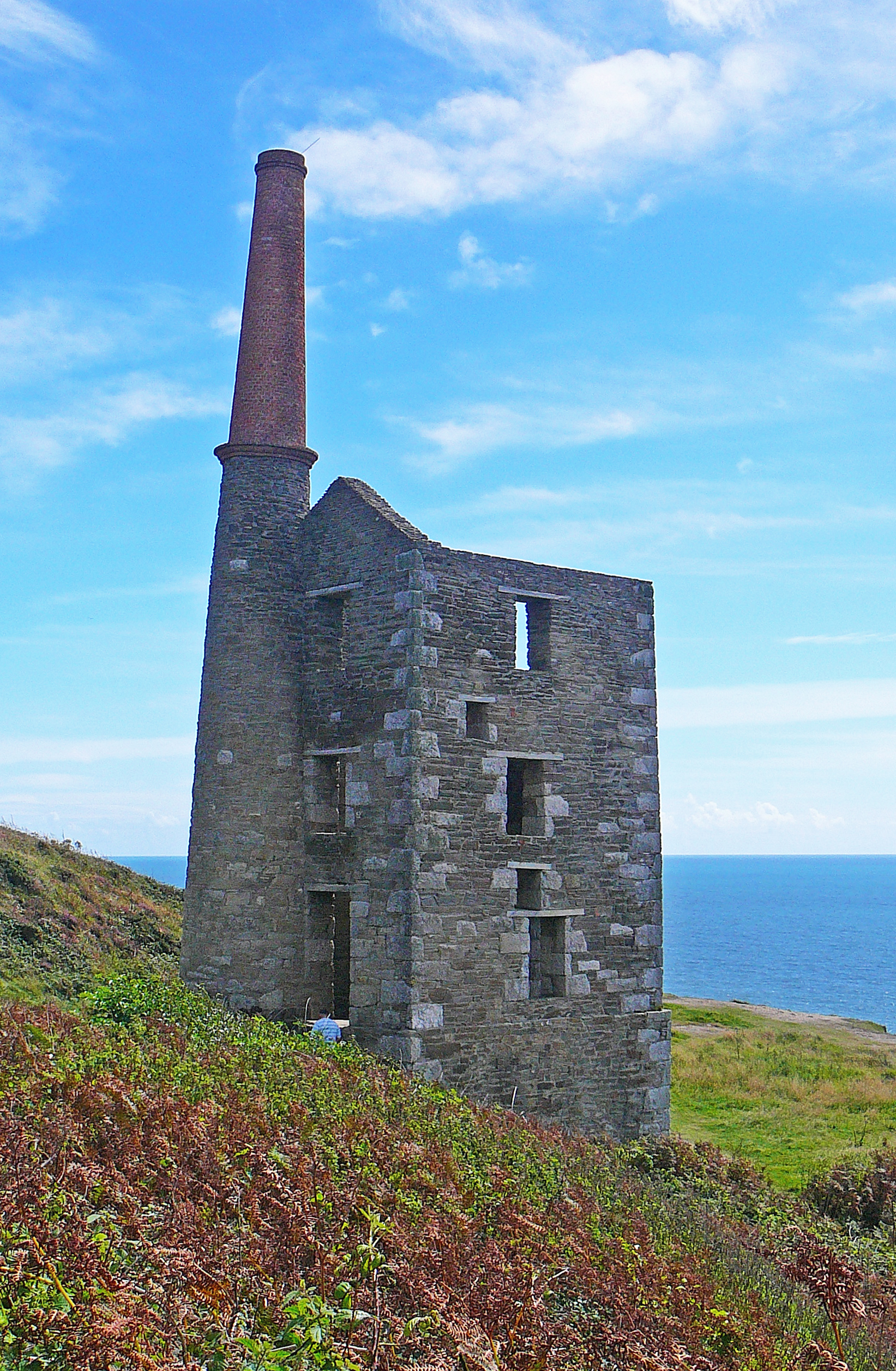

- Location within Cornwall
- 50°5′39.8″N 5°21′56.6″W
- Location: Breage, Cornwall, England
- OS grid reference: SW 594 270

History
- Built: 1860

Scheduled monument
- Official name: Wheal Prosper pumping engine house 210m south of Eastcliff Farm
- Designated: 18 July 1979
- Reference no.: 1021165

Listed Building – Grade II
- Official name: Wheal Prosper Engine House
- Designated: 26 August 1987
- Reference no.: 1142234

Wheal Prosper was a tin mine in Cornwall, England, a short distance from the hamlet of Rinsey and about 2.5 miles (4 km) west of Porthleven. The ruined engine house remains, overlooking Mount's Bay near Rinsey Head. The site is a Scheduled Monument, and the engine house is a Grade II listed building.

== History and description ==
The mine opened circa 1860 to exploit the Porthclew lode; it closed in 1866. It was acquired by the National Trust in 1969 and preserved.

The building housed an engine of cylinder diameter 30 inches, to pump water from the mine. It has three storeys; it is built of killas rubble, with dressed granite quoins, and the chimney has an upper section of brick.

== Mineral Statistics ==
From Robert Hunt's Mineral Statistics of the United Kingdom.

Tin Production (from stannary records; 1861-3)
Year(s)	Black (Tons)	Value (£)	Comment
1861	10.25	716.65	..
1862	..	19.30	Tinstuff, from Midsummer 1859 to Ladyday 1863 inclusive
1862	9.29	592.40	..
1862	28.47	1,778.90	From Midsummer 1859 to Ladyday 1863 inclusive
1863	4.93	326.38	..

Copper Production (1862–72)
Year(s)	Ore (Tons)	Metal (Tons)	Value (£)
1862	6.00	0.50	41.70
1863	4.00	0.20	13.10
1871	90.00	4.10	212.30
1872	194.00	2.80	26.40

== Gallery ==
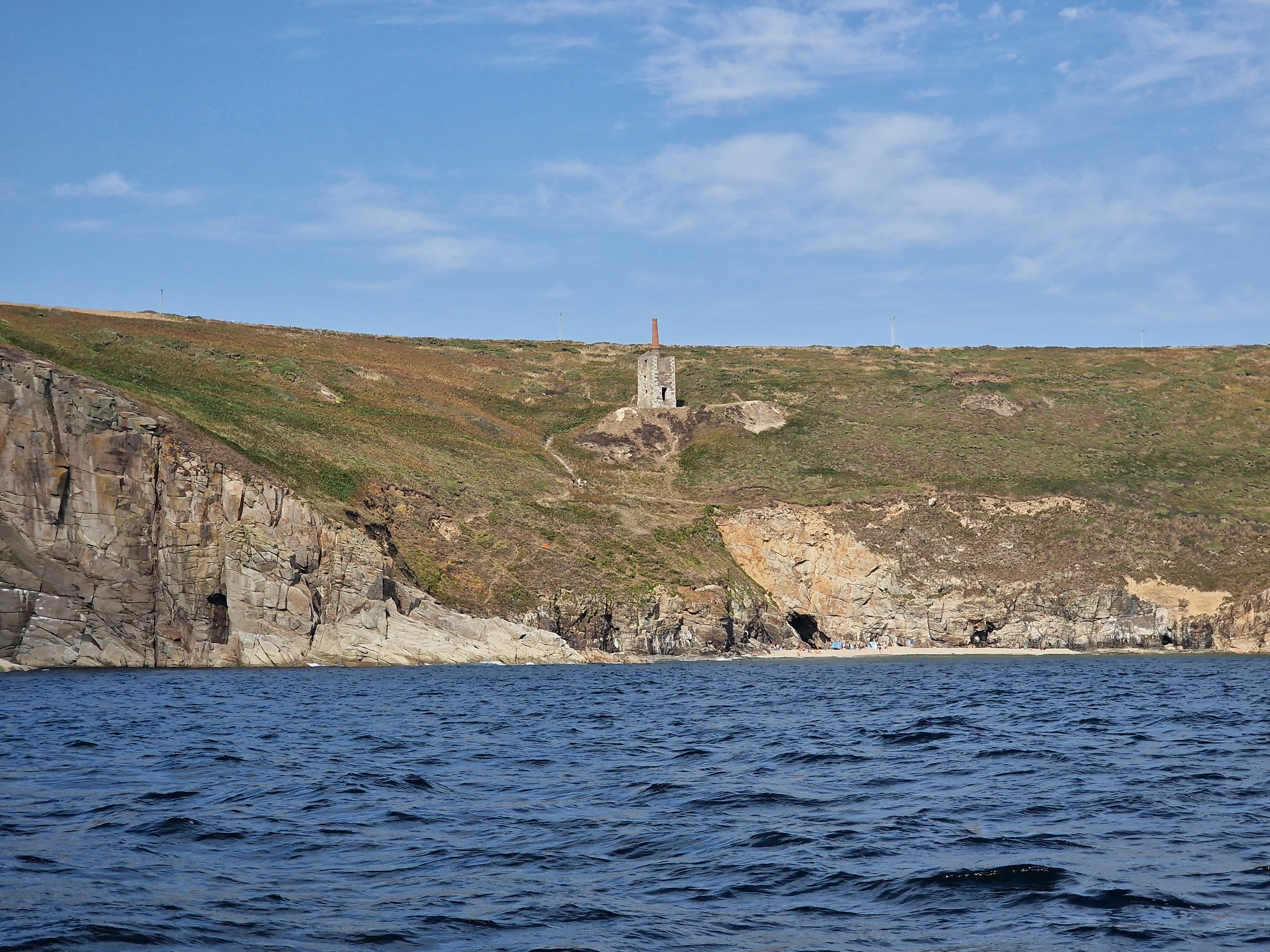
The mine seen from the sea

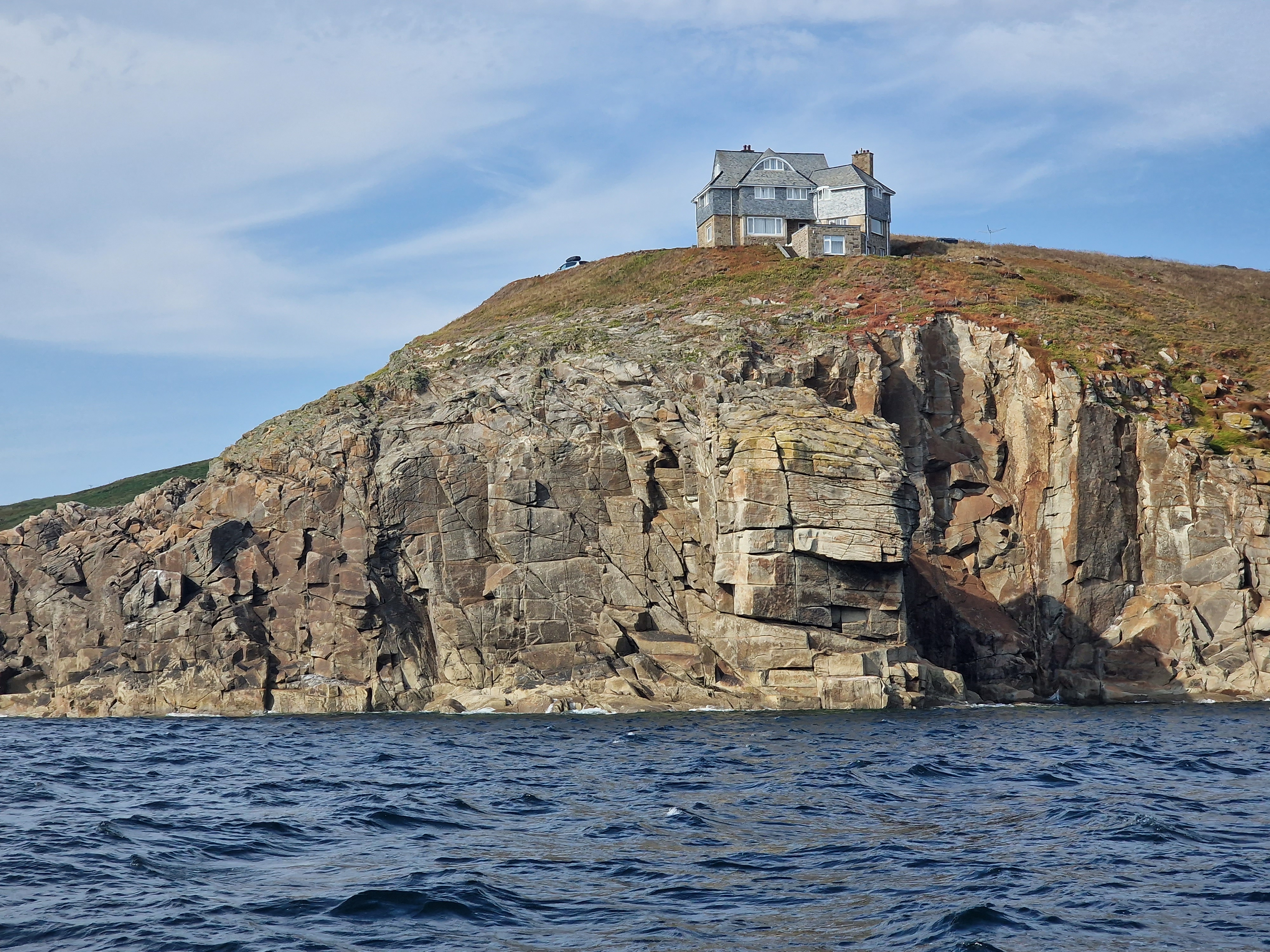
The nearby mine captains house

== See also ==
- Wheal Trewavas
- Wheal Vor
- Botallack Mine
- Levant Mine and Beam Engine
- Mining in Cornwall and Devon
- Cornwall and West Devon Mining Landscape
