= Wheal Trewavas =

Disused copper mine in Cornwall, England

- Hwel Trewavos (Cornish)
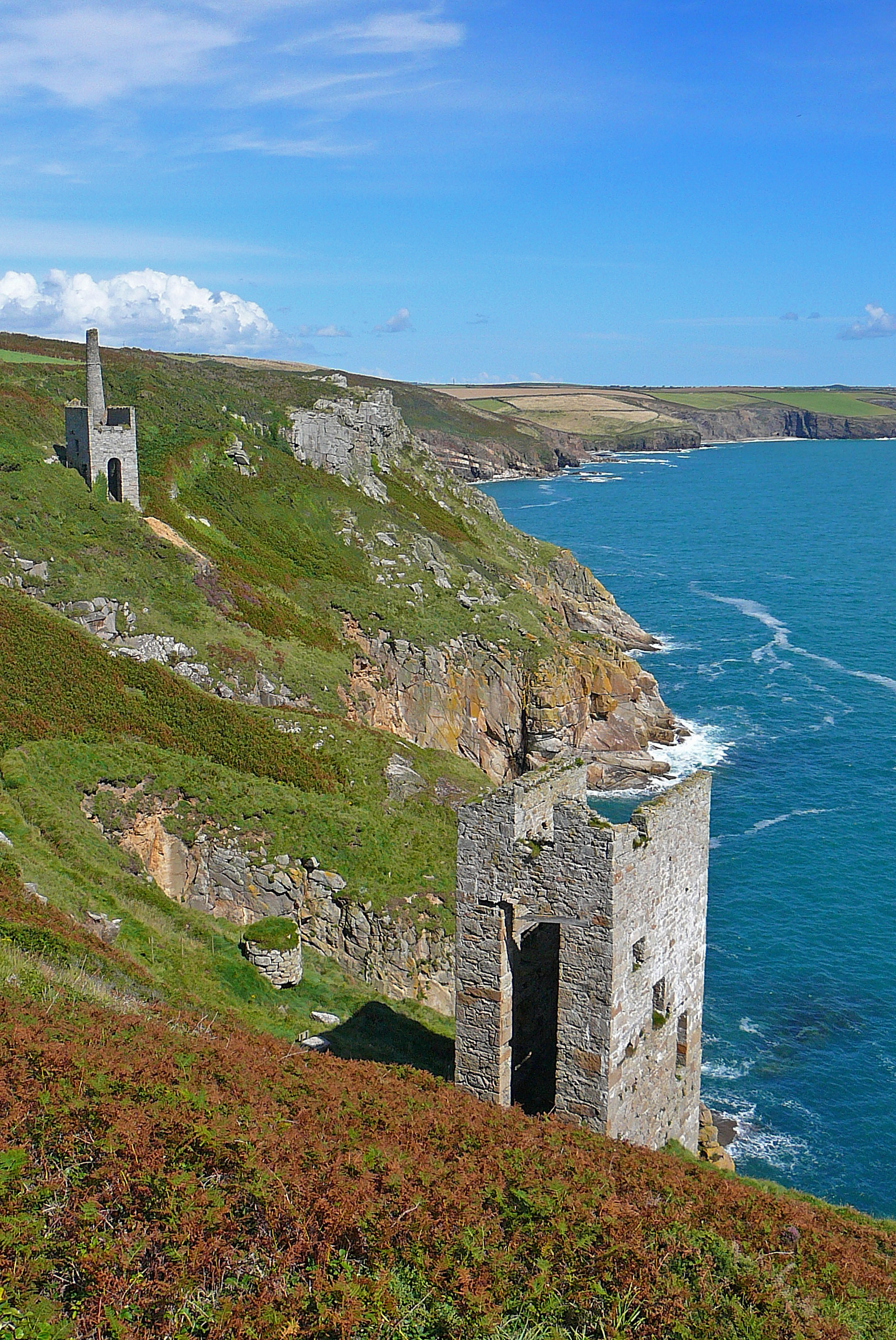
- The two engine houses

- Location within Cornwall
- 50°5′25″N 5°21′28″W
- Location: Breage, Cornwall, England
- OS grid reference: SW 599 265

History
- Built: 1834

Scheduled monument
- Official name: Wheal Trewavas copper mine 310m south of Trewavas
- Designated: 26 November 2004
- Reference no.: 1021324

Listed Building – Grade II
- Official name: Engine house and capstan plat at SW 598265, Old Shaft, Trewavas Mine
- Designated: 26 August 1987
- Reference no.: 1328350

Listed Building – Grade II
- Official name: Engine house at SW 600265, New Engine Shaft, Trewavas Mine
- Designated: 26 August 1987
- Reference no.: 1311611

Listed Building – Grade II
- Official name: Detached chimney at SW 598263, Trewavas Mine
- Designated: 26 August 1987
- Reference no.: 1142249

Listed Building – Grade II
- Official name: Detached chimney at SW 600265, serving engine house at New Engine Shaft, Trewavas Mine
- Designated: 26 August 1987
- Reference no.: 1142250

Wheal Trewavas (Cornish: Hwel Trewavos) was a copper mine in Cornwall, England, about 1.5 miles (2.4 km) west of Porthleven. The ruined engine houses remain, on sea cliffs overlooking Mount's Bay, just east of Trewavas Head. The site as a whole is a Scheduled Monument, and its engine houses and stone chimneys are Grade II listed structures managed by the National Trust, forming part of the Cornwall and West Devon Mining Landscape World Heritage Site.

== History ==
The mine was in operation from about 1834 to 1846. It exploited four copper lodes, which ran south-east along the coastline, and its workings were driven out under the sea from the start: by October 1835 the first level, 22 fathoms below the surface, had been driven "about 20 fathoms out to sea", and a correspondent called it "this Botallack mine in miniature".

There are two engine houses. The building to the west served the first shaft, Old Engine Shaft, where an engine was at work by October 1835. In 1838 the mine had two engines: a 45-inch pumping engine and an 18-inch winding engine. To the east, the engine house at New Engine Shaft began operation in 1836 for a 45-inch pumping engine. In June 1841, a single 45-inch engine was pumping both shafts, one of them through 95 fathoms (about 174m) of flat rods at the surface.

In 1838 the mine employed 161 people: 102 men, 42 women, and 17 children. Between 1835 and 1846 it sold about 17,350 long tons of copper ore, containing about 1,400 long tons of copper. In 1844 the 45-inch engine, a steam whim and the pitwork of a whole shaft were advertised for sale, and in 1846 a much larger 70-inch engine with three boilers was offered with the mine's materials.

=== Closure of the mine ===
Work stopped in May 1846 because, the captains reported, "the lode has most decidedly failed as the mine has deepened." The Mining Journal later gave Trewavas as an example of a mine "where debts were incurred to the amount of some 4000l. or 5000l., and dividends paid out of money obtained by way of loan from the bankers". A rumour in 1844 that the sea had broken in was denied at the adventurers' meeting.

The mine is often said to have closed when the sea broke into the workings. An 1864 report on neighbouring Wheal Prosper said it had been "suddenly suspended, about sixteen years since, when the sea so mysteriously broke in". There is a later local story that the annual dinner of the "tributers" was to take place in a tunnel under the sea; two men making final preparations to the tables noticed water leaking from the tunnel roof, and quickly left. The sea soon broke in, before the time planned for the dinner. Treseder (1986) notes that "whether removal of this ground resulted in the sea being breached is not known".

== Later History ==
Two years after the stop, C. A. Johns described Trewavas Head from across Mount's Bay as "a pile of granite rocks, among which may be distinguished the chimneys of a forsaken mine, which until recently was worked under the sea". The site is now owned by the National Trust, and both engine houses and their chimneys were consolidated in 2008-09.

== Description ==
The engine house and chimney of Old Engine Shaft are situated on the cliffside, about 20 metres (66 ft) above the sea and about 40 metres (130 ft) from the clifftop. The engine house measures 9.4 by 6.4m in plan, and its rear wall stands about 15.5m high. Adjoining the building is a capstan platform; during the operation of the mine, a manually operated capstan lowered equipment down the shaft. The chimney is separate from the engine house, and was built about 1840, replacing an earlier chimney. The engine house and chimney are both Grade II listed buildings.

The engine house and separate chimney of New Engine Shaft are a short distance further east along the coast, near the top of the cliff. The chimney, built entirely of granite, is 15.75m high on its uphill side, and 18.65m on its downhill side. They are both Grade II listed buildings.

== Mineral Statistics ==
From Robert Hunt's Mineral Statistics of the United Kingdom.

Copper Production (from ticketing records; 1835-1857)
Year(s)	Ore (Tons)	Metal (Tons)	Value (£)
1835	267.00	29.13	2273.20
1836	1339.00	122.84	11624.43
1837	1156.00	95.72	7208.73
1838	1025.00	87.39	6675.63
1839	1262.00	109.50	8183.78
1840	1849.00	147.72	11609.25
1841	2366.00	176.18	15659.93
1842	2775.00	209.87	16288.43
1843	2316.00	198.35	15023.18
1844	1607.00	127.27	9283.50
1845	977.00	73.15	5452.50
1846	397.00	33.38	2330.73
1857	18.00	0.72	68.40

== See also ==
- Wheal Prosper, Rinsey
- Mining in Cornwall and Devon
- Cornwall and West Devon Mining Landscape
- Wheal Vor
- Levant Mine and Beam Engine
- Botallack Mine
