= Great Work Mine =

Disused mine in Cornwall, England

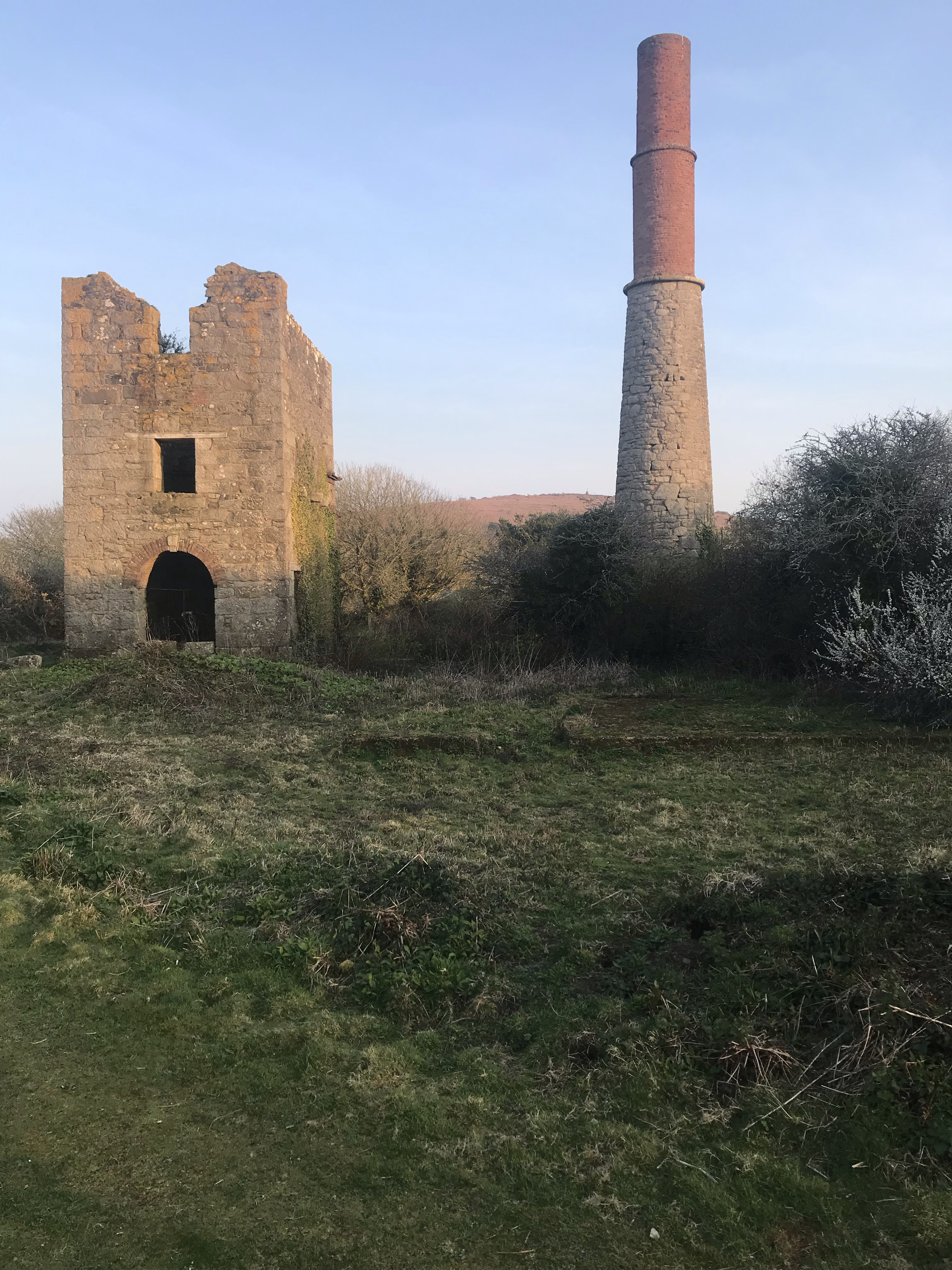
- Great Work Mine (Leeds Engine House)

- Location in Cornwall
- Location: Great Work, Cornwall, UK; 50°07′40″N 5°21′55″W
- Products: Copper, Lead & Tin
- Opened: 1538
- Closed: 1939

Listed Building – Grade II
- Official name: Engine house at SW595307, Leeds Shaft, Great Work Mine, and associated remains
- Designated: 26 August 1987
- Reference no.: 1328328

Listed Building – Grade II
- Official name: Detached chimney at SW595307, Leeds Shaft, Great Work Mine
- Designated: 26 August 1987
- Reference no.: 1142269

Great Work Mine was a Cornish mine between Godolphin hill and Tregonning Hill and is in the hamlet of Great Work on Bal Lane. Great Work is notable for its unusual chimney stack with the upper brick-work in two stages. The remaining ruin of the mine sits 400 ft above sea level, and is part of the Cornwall and West Devon Mining Landscape.

The site is owned by the National Trust and forms part of the Godolphin Estate along with Godolphin House.

== History ==
It had opened by 1538. John Leland visited the mine and was quoted as saying "There are no greater Tynne workes yn al Cornwal than be on Sir Wylliam Godolcan's Ground". By 1584 at least 300 employed were there, and the annual profit was £1000. Until 1816 the mine exploited the surface and shallow pits. Deep mining started then and continued until 1873. The mine worked five lodes, ran five engines and employed 500 people.

The mine was put up for sale as a going concern, by William Teague of Treliske, in January 1885. While the mine was not exhausted, new machinery and investment was needed and if the mine was not sold, it would close. Machinery, included three engines, plant and materials were put up for auction on 30 November 1885. C M Thomas purchased the mine in 1888 and formed a limited liability company with capital of £100,000. The pumping and stamping engines restarted on 10 October 1888.

=== 1930 onwards ===
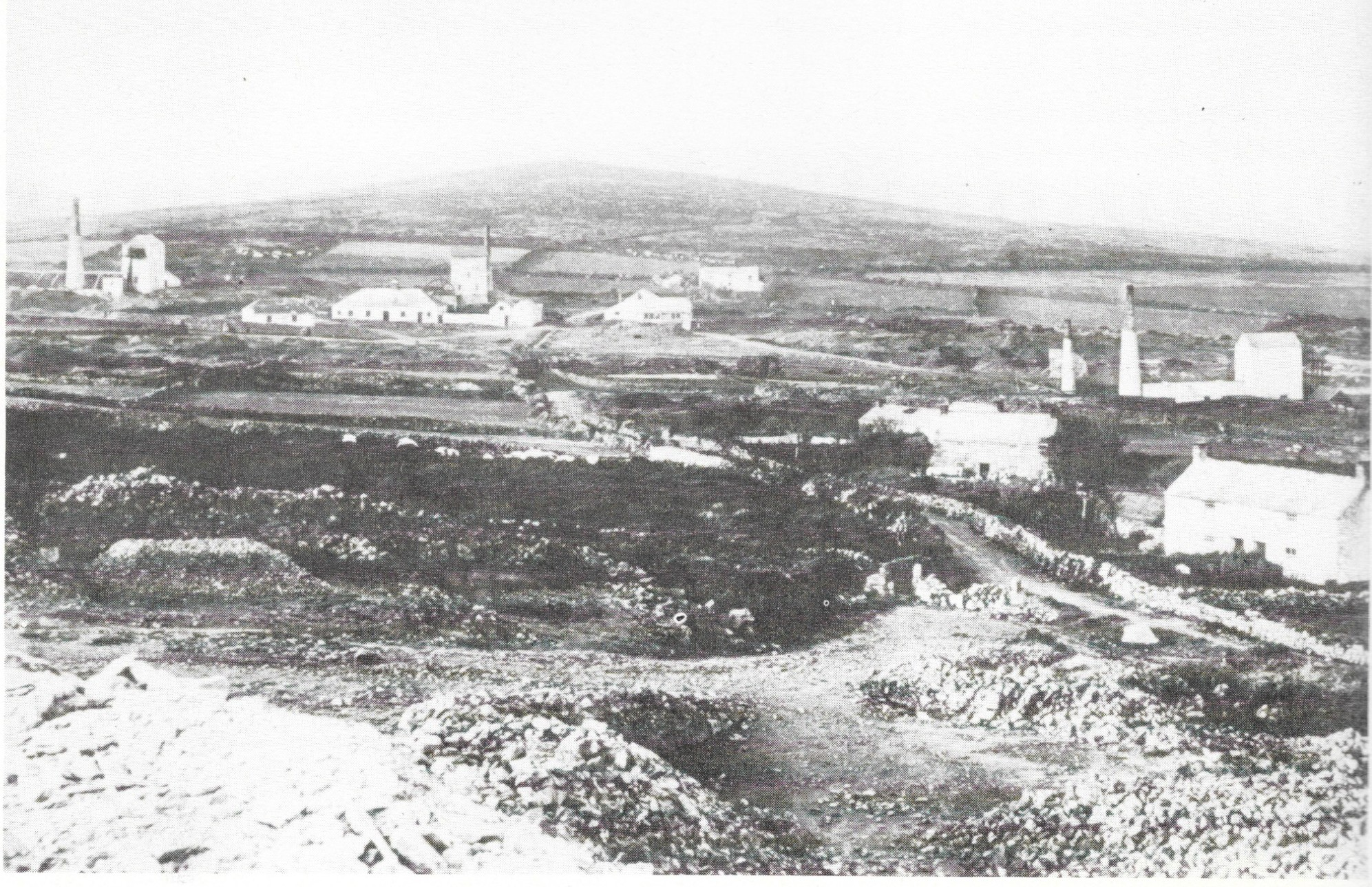
Fig 1, Great Work Mine, late 19th-century

In 1930 the mine closed. Some miners continued working above adit level. The mine was de-watered in the mid-1930s in an attempt to reopen it. The effort was abandoned and the mine closed permanently in 1939. During this time, on Bal Lane a terrace of twenty-six houses were built for miners. The ruins at Great Work reveal a fraction of the mine's extent. In the photo the engine house on the far left is the Leeds shaft and is all that remains.

In 2005 the Leeds shaft engine house was restored. This shaft and Burnt Whim were capped with a metal grate, for safety and to promote nesting bats within the shaft.

== See also ==
- Wheal Vor
