= Great Work, Cornwall =

Great Work
- Hamlet
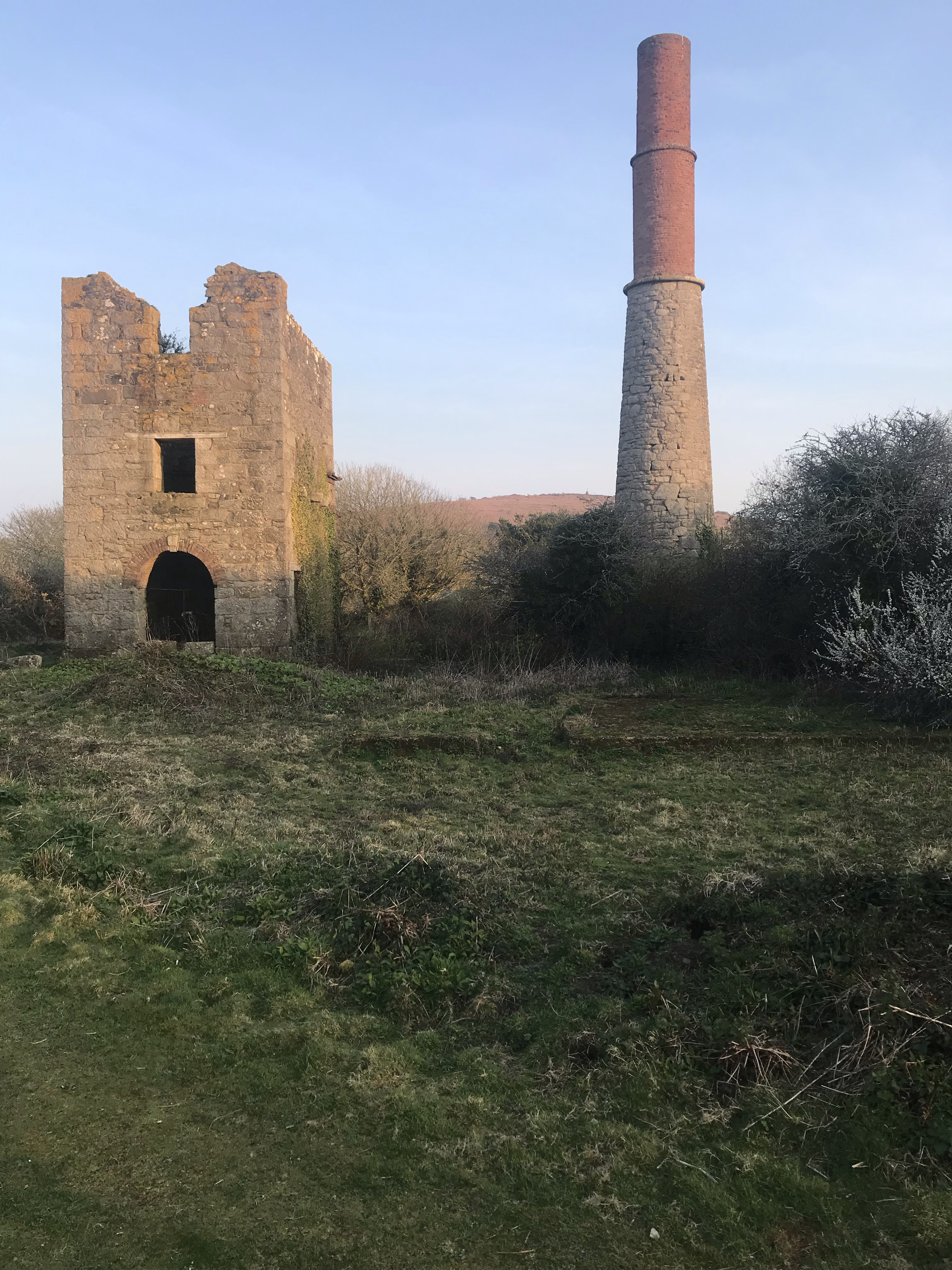
- Great Work Mine at sunset

- Location within Cornwall
- OS grid reference: SW 5916 3065
- Civil parish: Germoe
- Unitary authority: Cornwall
- Ceremonial county: Cornwall
- Region: South West
- Country: England
- Sovereign state: United Kingdom
- Post town: HELSTON
- Postcode district: TR13
- Dialling code: 01736
- Police: Devon and Cornwall
- Fire: Cornwall
- Ambulance: South Western
- UK Parliament: St Ives

Great Work is a hamlet near the village of Godolphin Cross and located several miles west of the town of Helston, in the south-west of the county of Cornwall, England. It is home to the Great Work Mine.
