= Tregonning (hamlet) =

Tregonning is a hamlet is located to the north of Gummow's Shop in the civil parish of St Newlyn East in mid Cornwall, England, United Kingdom.

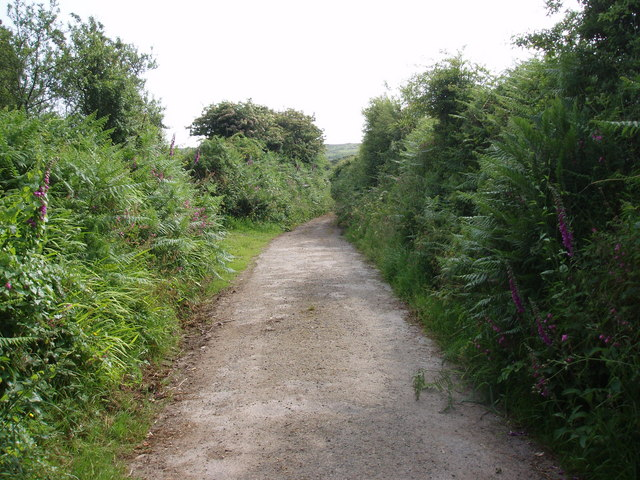
Tregonning
