= Port of Hayle =

Harbour in Cornwall, England

The Port of Hayle (Cornish: Porth Heyl) is an important mining port, harbour and former industrial centre located in the town of Hayle, on the north coast of Cornwall. The Port is within the area of the Cornwall and West Devon Mining Landscape World Heritage site.

== History ==
The port used to be a centre of heavy industry and the home of two iron foundries (those of Harvey's of Hayle and the Cornish Copper Company) that were established in the early 18th century, around which Hayle's two distinct population centres at Foundry and Copperhouse primarily grew. Most of the original buildings were demolished in the 1940s and 1950s.

In 1939, Imperial Chemical Industries and the Associated Ethyl Company (later called Octel) built a plant at North Quay to extract bromine from seawater. In 1972, it was announced the plant would close, due to rising costs and limited capacity, with the loss of 70 jobs. At the time, the Hayle Chamber of Commerce stated that it expected that all the businesses at North Quay would go out of business within five to ten years. The factory closed in 1973 and the site was cleared by 1974.

The modern management of the Harbour was taken over by the Hayle Harbour Company Limited, following the passage of the Hayle Harbour Act 1989. From 2002 there have been many plans drawn up as regards the development of the harbour.

=== 2000s ===
In June 2002, Hayle Harbour Company spent over £300,000 on a series of preparatory surveys and ecological studies of the location. The next month, Penwith District Council set out plans for the creation of Apertura, a "centre of excellence in photography". With a planned cost of £8.2 million, it was hoped that this would be able to successfully compete with other tourist attractions in Cornwall, such as Tate St Ives, Falmouth Maritime Museum and the Eden Project, attracting up to 100,000 visitors per year. These were promptly expanded to include some housing, commercial, retail and leisure facilities. With a centrepiece of a £23 million art gallery, it was possible to display a project with an overall price tag of £200 million, that also encompassed a new bridge link to North Quay, a tidal impoundment scheme and improved fishing harbour facilities.

The scheme was approved by Penwith District Council, but the owners, Rosshill Properties went bankrupt before the planning proposal could be submitted to Cornwall County Council. Penwith District Council refused to buy the site and, in August 2003, it was reported that development firm London and Amsterdam Ltd was in negotiations over the harbour's purchase. The company's name was later changed to ING RED UK, and it acquired the site in October 2004.

The area of the former port was granted World Heritage status as part of the Cornwall and West Devon Mining Landscape in 2006.

=== 2010s ===
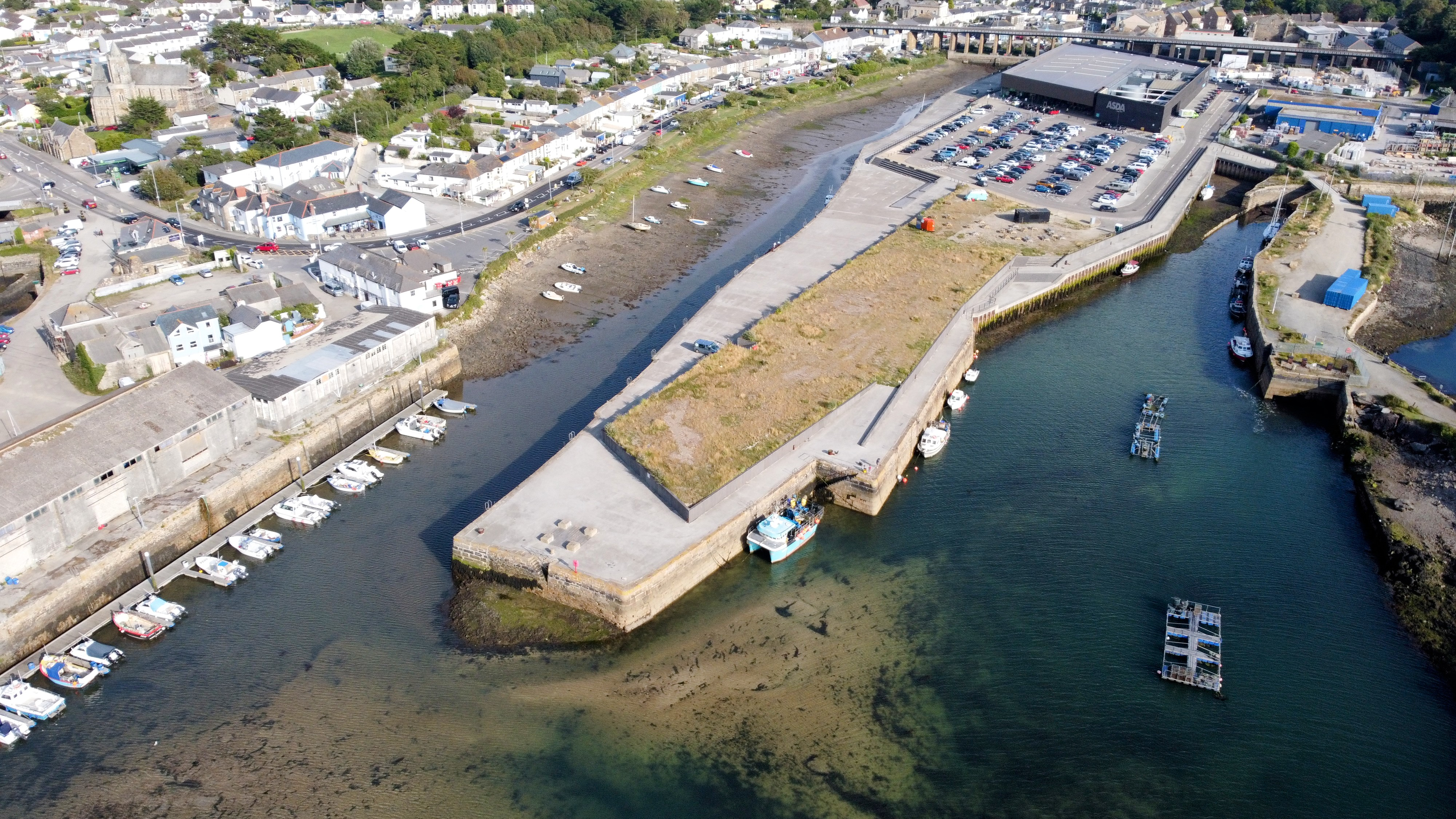
South Quay in 2021, showing the vacant space awaiting development and, in the background, the ASDA supermarket

Archaeological assessment on the South Quay in August 2010 found buried quay walls, revetments and a slipway. In August 2011, ING agreed to reinstate sluicing as an alternative to dredging in order to keep channels in the harbour clear after campaigners warned that further dredging would destroy Hayle Beach. Sluicing was re-introduced to the harbour in 2017.

The first phase of South Quay's redevelopment, predicted to cost £30 million, began in December 2013 despite opposition from English Heritage and ICOMOS. It included an ASDA store, which became the first to have signage in Cornish and the only branch in the country without a green sign, after residents complained when designs were unveiled. The redevelopment won one of RIBA's Regional Awards in 2015.

In 2016, to celebrate ten years of the World Heritage Site status, the port hosted heritage and cultural events, including a being a stop on the tour of the Man Engine (named after the man engine), the largest mechanical puppet ever made in Britain.

In 2017 it was announced by architects Feilden Clegg Bradley Studios, that the plans for the second phase of the development on South Quay had been "significantly reworked" after a review by UNESCO. Responses from local politicians to the new plans were generally positive, with Cornwall Councillor John Pollard saying that people in Hayle "wanted to see the improvement ... completed" and Loveday Jenkin saying that developers had "worked hard" with ICOMOS to alleviate their concerns, and the proposed retail unit and apartments were approved unanimously by the council's planning committee. The proposals for 27 flats and houses were deferred due to the quay's listed walls.

In May 2019, the first phase of development for the harbour's North Quay was deferred 11 votes to 3 by Cornwall Council's planning committee, mainly due to the multi-storey buildings proposed to be built on the edge of the quay. ICOMOS had also filed a report saying it was concerned about the height of the buildings and that the development would have a detrimental effect on the area's World Heritage status.

=== 2020s ===
The first residents moved into Cannery Row, the first part of phase one development on North Quay, in autumn 2020.

In February 2021, Devon and Cornwall Police objected to the second phase of development at North Quay, saying that it would cause an "unacceptable burden on police infrastructure". The police force asked that the proposals for 375 new homes, a hotel, shops and other amenities not be given planning approval until developers had agreed to pay contributions towards local infrastructure associated with the development. ICOMOS also objected to the proposals, saying that they would have "unacceptable impacts on the Outstanding Universal Value of the Hayle Harbour", and that the applicants had misrepresented their comments in a report they had submitted to the council. The planning committee voted 12 to one to defer the application, and it was passed in April 2021 after developers removed several elements of the proposal which ICOMOS had had the most concerns over.

In February 2024, building work at North Quay halted as the developer Corinthian Homes and several connected companies went into administration. Although the site included working parts of Hayle harbour, the administrators confirmed that they would remain operational. At a town council meeting in March 2024, a consultant brought in to deliver the development said that work would re-begin on some parts of the scheme within weeks.
