= Gummow (surname) =

Gummow is a surname. Notable people with the surname include:

- Benjamin Gummow (1766–1840), Welsh architect
- William Gummow (1942–2026), Australian judge
