= Paratacamite =

Mineral in the halide minerals category

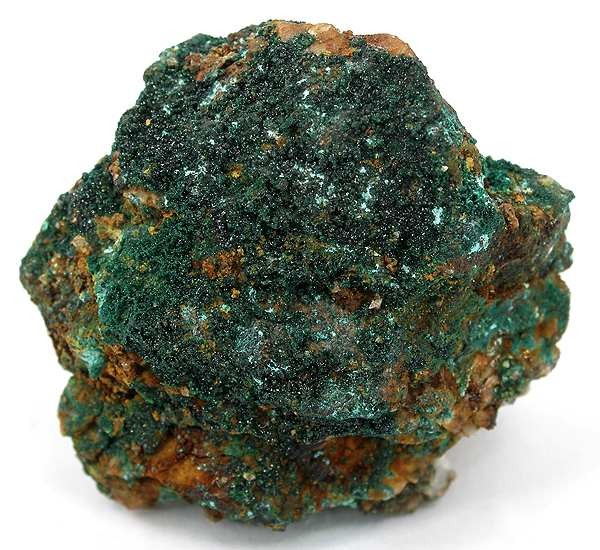
- Paratacamite from Cornwall, England

General
- Category: Halide mineral
- Formula: Cu_{3}(Cu,Zn)(OH)_{6}Cl_{2}
- IMA symbol: Pata
- Strunz classification: III / D.01-55
- Crystal system: Trigonal
- Crystal class: Rhombohedral
- Unit cell: a = 13,654, c = 14,041;

Identification
- Formula mass: 58.433 g/mol
- Color: Green
- Cleavage: Very good
- Fracture: Conchoidal
- Mohs scale hardness: 3
- Luster: Vitreous
- Streak: Green
- Diaphaneity: Transparent
- Specific gravity: 3.74
- Density: 3.74g/cm^{3}
- Solubility: Acid-soluble

Paratacamite is a mineral in the halide minerals category. Its chemical formula is Cu_{3}(Cu,Zn)(OH)_{6}Cl_{2}. Its name is derived from its association with atacamite. Paratacamite was first described by Herbert Smith in 1906. The zincian endmember Cu_{3}(Zn)(OH)_{6}Cl_{2} is called herbertsmithite, and paratacamite is polymorphous with botallackite and atacamite.

It has been found in Chile, Botallack Mine in Cornwall, Broken Hill, Australia, and in Italy at Capo Calamita on the island of Elba.

== See also ==
- Atacamite
