= Atacamite =

Halide evaporite mineral

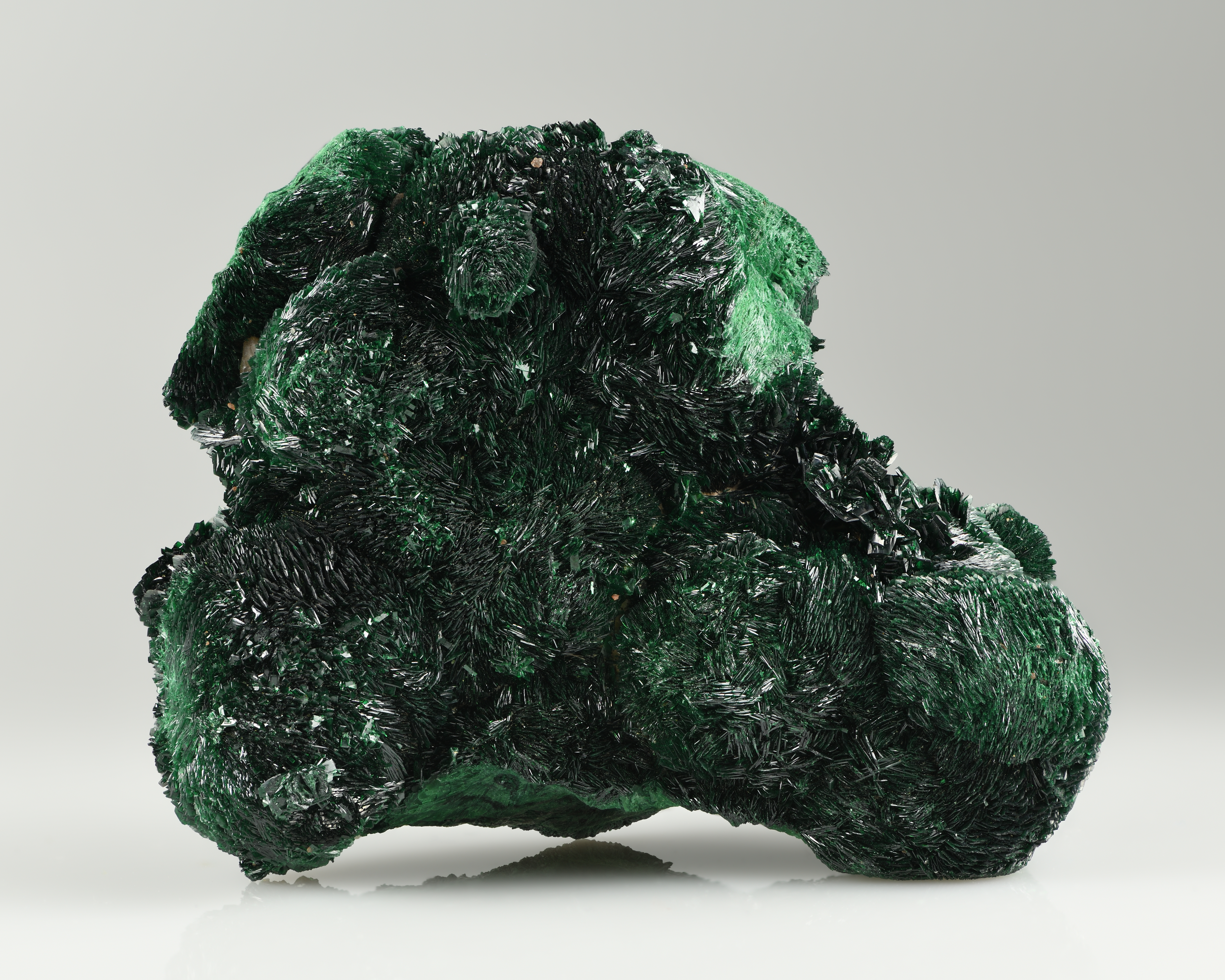
- Atacamite from Mt. Gunson mines, South Australia

General
- Category: Halide mineral
- Formula: Cu_{2}Cl(OH)_{3}
- IMA symbol: Ata
- Strunz classification: 3.DA.10a
- Crystal system: Orthorhombic
- Crystal class: Dipyramidal (mmm); H-M symbol: (2/m 2/m 2/m)
- Space group: Pnma
- Unit cell: a = 6.03, b = 9.12 c = 6.865 [Å]; Z = 4

Identification
- Color: Bright green, dark emerald-green to blackish green
- Crystal habit: Slender prismatic crystals, fibrous, granular to compact, massive
- Twinning: Contact and penetration with complex twinned groupings
- Cleavage: Perfect on {010}, fair on {101}
- Fracture: Conchoidal
- Tenacity: Brittle
- Mohs scale hardness: 3–3.5
- Luster: Adamantine to vitreous
- Streak: Apple green
- Diaphaneity: Transparent to translucent
- Specific gravity: 3.745–3.776
- Optical properties: Biaxial (−)
- Refractive index: n_{α} = 1.831 n_{β} = 1.861 n_{γ} = 1.880
- Birefringence: δ = 0.049
- Pleochroism: X = pale green; Y = yellow-green; Z = grass-green
- 2V angle: Calculated: 74°
- Dispersion: r < v, strong

Atacamite is a copper halide mineral: a copper(II) chloride hydroxide with formula Cu_{2}Cl(OH)_{3}. It was first described from deposits in the Atacama Desert of Chile in 1802 by Dmitri Alekseyevich Golitsyn. The Atacama Desert is also the namesake of the mineral.

== Occurrence ==
Atacamite is polymorphous with botallackite, clinoatacamite, and paratacamite. Atacamite is a comparatively rare mineral, formed from primary copper minerals in the oxidation or weathering zone of arid climates. It has also been reported as a volcanic sublimate from fumarole deposits, as sulfide alteration products in black smokers. The mineral has also been found naturally on oxidized copper deposits in Chile, China, Russia, Czech Republic, Arizona, and Australia. It occurs in association with cuprite, brochantite, linarite, caledonite, malachite, and chrysocolla and its polymorphs.

=== Synthetic occurrence ===
Atacamite has been discovered in the patina of the Statue of Liberty, and as alteration of ancient bronze and copper artifacts. The bronze of the Antikythera mechanism had turned to atacamite under the sea.

The mineral has been found as a pigment in sculpture, manuscripts, maps, and frescoes discovered in Eurasia, Russia, and Persia.

=== Biomineral ===
Atacamite occurs as a biomineral in the jaws of bloodworms.

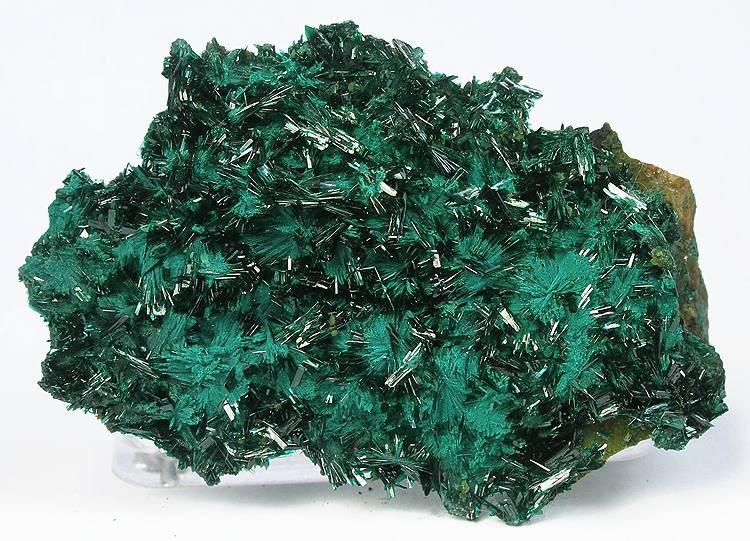
Atacamite prisms from Chile

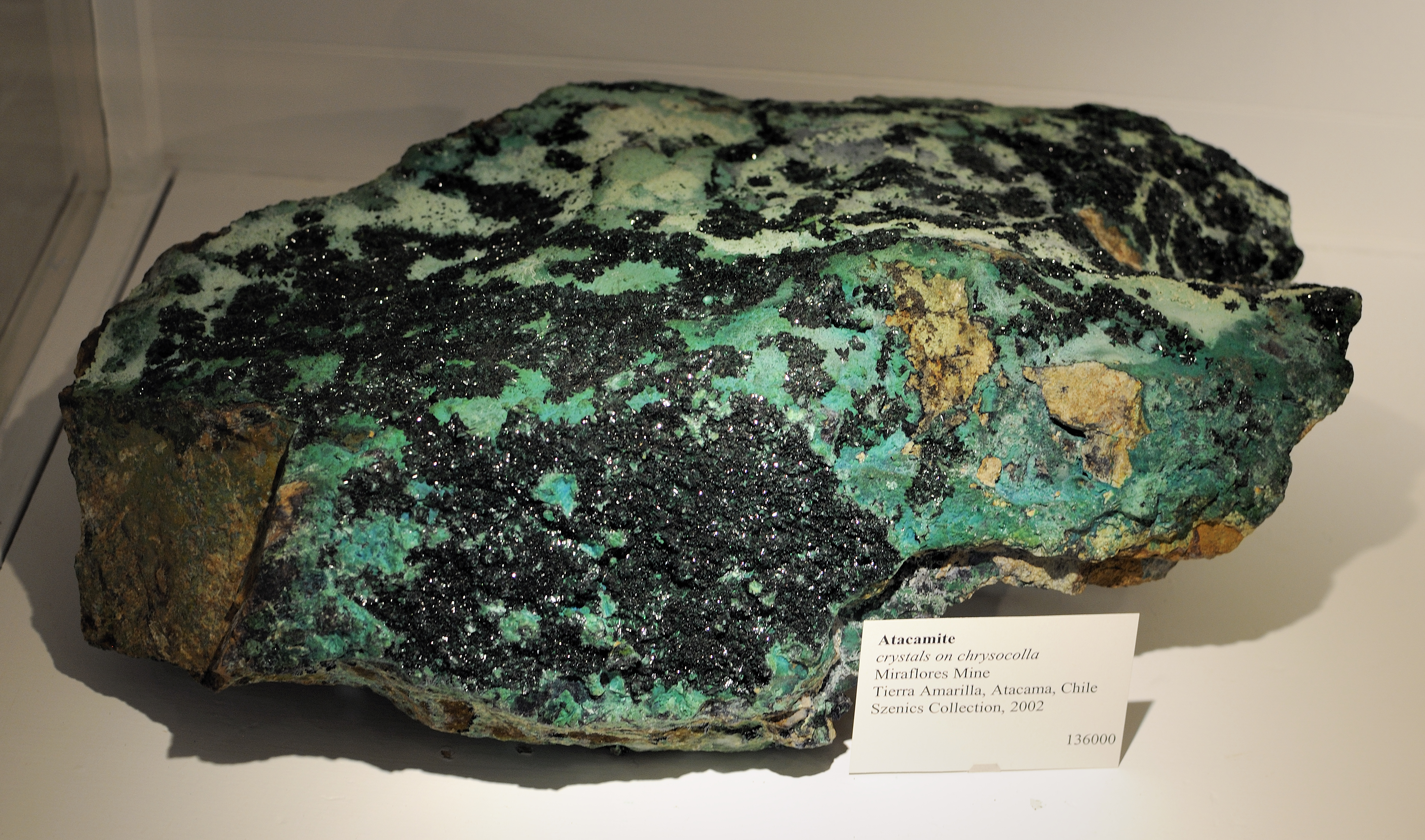
Atacamite from Chile displayed in the Harvard Museum of Natural History

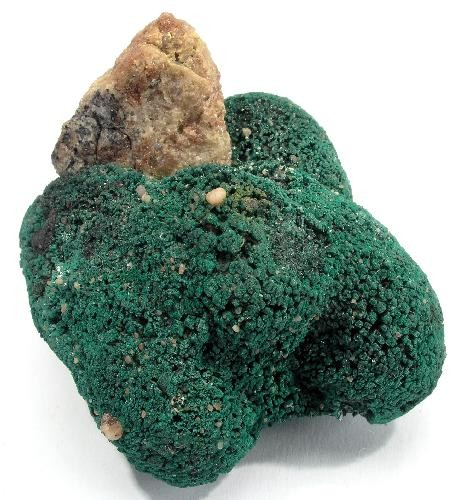
Atacamite from Mt. Gunson, South Australia
