= St Agnes Mining District =

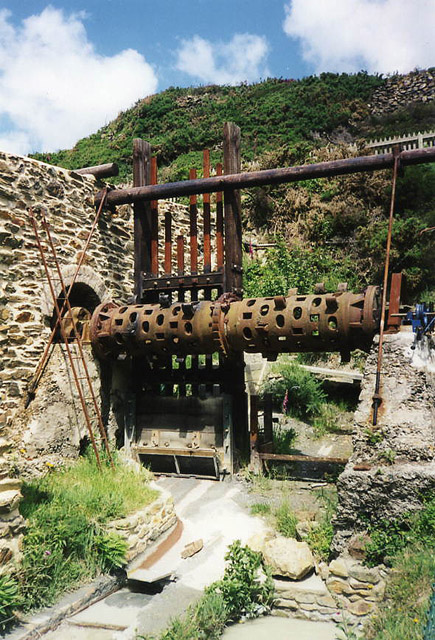
Blue Hills tin streams

The St Agnes Mining District is that part of the Cornwall and West Devon Mining Landscape UNESCO World Heritage Site surrounding the village of St Agnes, Cornwall, UK. It contains Wheal Coates tin mine, Great Wheal Charlotte copper mine and Blue Hills, which is the only surviving tin production centre in the United Kingdom
