= C.R. Gummow Public School =

Location
- 311 Cottesmore Ave; Cobourg, Ontario, K9A 4E3; Canada; 43°57′56″N 78°09′14″W

Information
- School type: Public, Elementary school
- Religious affiliation: none
- School board: Kawartha Pine Ridge District School Board
- School number: 102644
- Principal: Kara Trumbley-Novak
- Grades: JK–8
- Enrollment: 740 (2021)
- Language: English, Canadian French
- Website: crgummow.kprdsb.ca
- Last updated: 9 November 2017

C. R. Gummow Public School is a public elementary school in Cobourg, Ontario, Canada. It offers instruction from Junior Kindergarten to grade 8 and in French immersion from senior kindergarten to grade 8. The school is part of the Kawartha Pine Ridge District School Board and as of 2016 had 703 students.

The school underwent a 20 million dollar project to rebuild the school on the existing property in January 2013; construction started in November 2013 and the school opened to students and staff on March 23, 2015. The old buildings were demolished by May and the yard has not yet been completed. The school principal was Ms. Kneen from 2003 to 2015, and Ms. White from 2015 to 2016.
