= Gummow's Shop =

Coordinates: 50.378°N 5.001°W

Gummow's Shop: Cornish: Shoppa Kommow
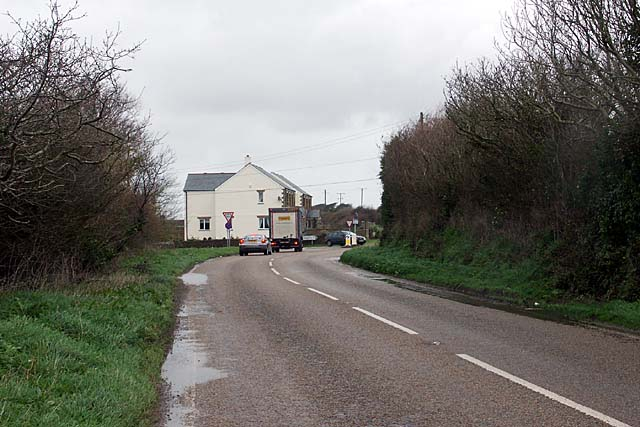
- Road junction at Gummow's Shop

- Location within Cornwall
- OS grid reference: SW867574
- Unitary authority: Cornwall
- Ceremonial county: Cornwall
- Region: South West
- Country: England
- Sovereign state: United Kingdom
- Post town: Newquay
- Postcode district: TR8

Gummow's Shop (Cornish: Shoppa Kommow, meaning coombes workshop) is a hamlet in the civil parish of St Newlyn East in mid Cornwall, England, UK. It is on the A3058 road southeast of Kestle Mill. Before 1938, there was a blacksmith in the building now known as "The Old Smithy". It is in the civil parish of Cubert

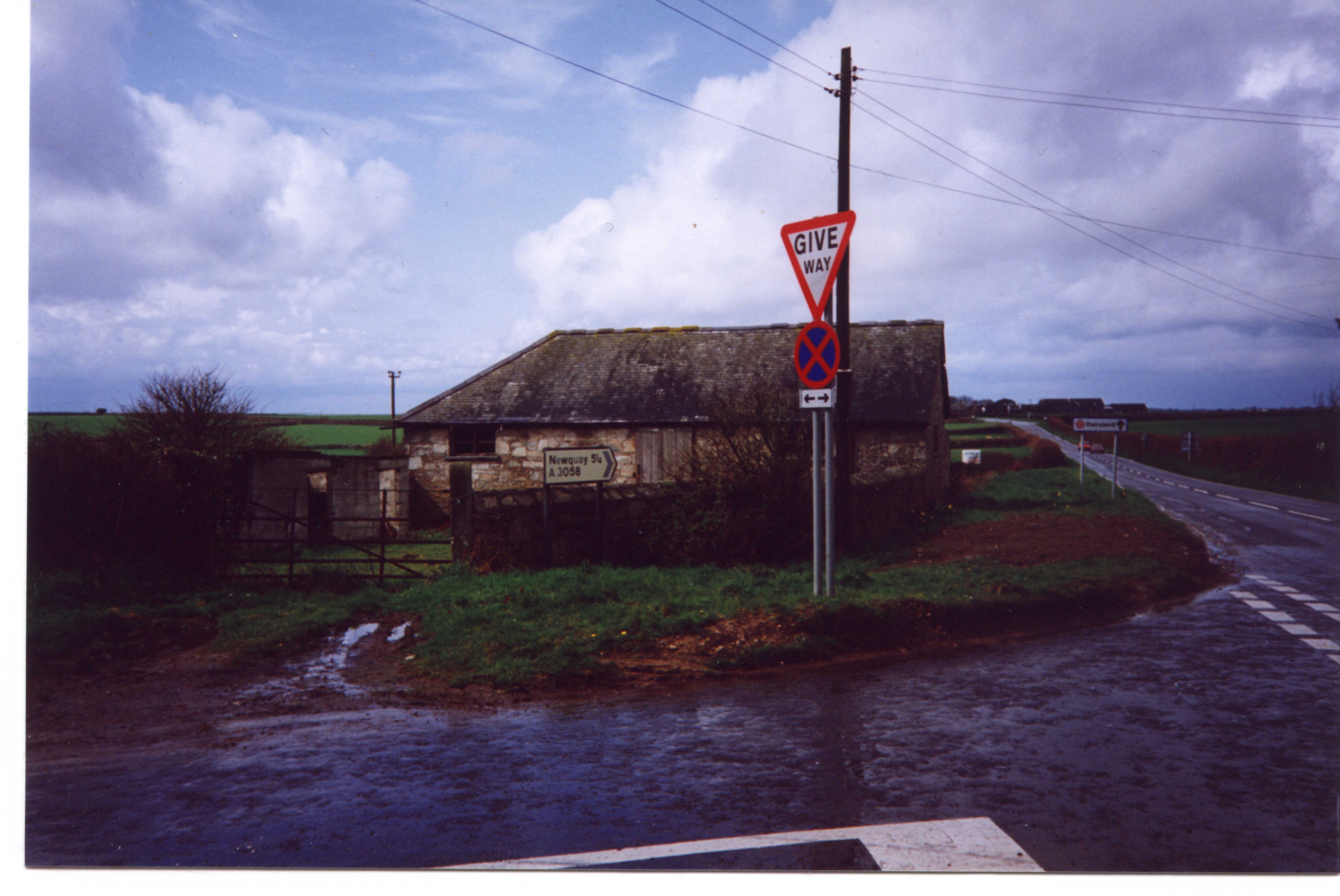
The old smithy at Gummow's Shop, taken 29 March 1992
