= Botallackite =

Halide mineral

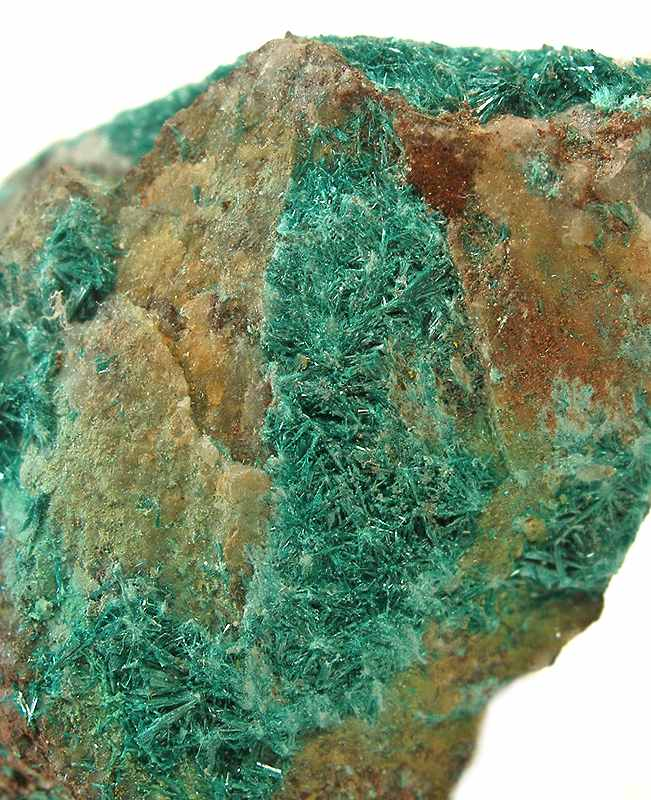
- Botallackite from the Levant Mine, Cornwall

General
- Category: Halide minerals
- Formula: Cu_{2}(OH)_{3}Cl
- IMA symbol: Blk
- Strunz classification: 3.DA.10b
- Crystal system: Monoclinic
- Crystal class: Prismatic (2/m) (same H-M symbol)
- Space group: P2_{1}/m
- Unit cell: a = 5.717 Å, b = 6.126 Å, c = 5.636 Å; β = 93.07°; Z = 2

Identification
- Colour: Shades of green
- Crystal habit: Platy interlaced crystal crusts
- Cleavage: {100} Perfect
- Mohs scale hardness: Soft
- Diaphaneity: Transparent to translucent
- Specific gravity: 3.6
- Optical properties: Biaxial (+)
- Refractive index: n_{α}= 1.775, n_{β}= 1.800, n_{γ}= 1.846
- Birefringence: δ = 0.071
- Pleochroism: Weak – blue green shades
- Dispersion: r > v, strong

Botallackite, chemical formula Cu_{2}(OH)_{3}Cl is a secondary copper mineral, named for its type locality at the Botallack Mine in St Just in Penwith, Cornwall. It is polymorphous with atacamite, paratacamite and clinoatacamite.

Botallackite crystallises in the monoclinic crystal system. It is mountain-green to green in colour, with one distinct to good cleavage.

== Discovery and occurrence ==
It was first described in 1865 for an occurrence in the Botallack mine, Cornwall, England, and named for the type locality.

Botallackite forms in copper deposits exposed to weathering and salt water. It is reported from black smoker deposits due to reaction of primary sulfide minerals with seawater. It also occurs on copper bearing slag exposed to seawater. Minerals associated with botallackite include atacamite, paratacamite, brochantite, connellite and gypsum.
