= Botallack Mine =

Former mine in Cornwall, England

- Hwel Bostalek (Cornish)
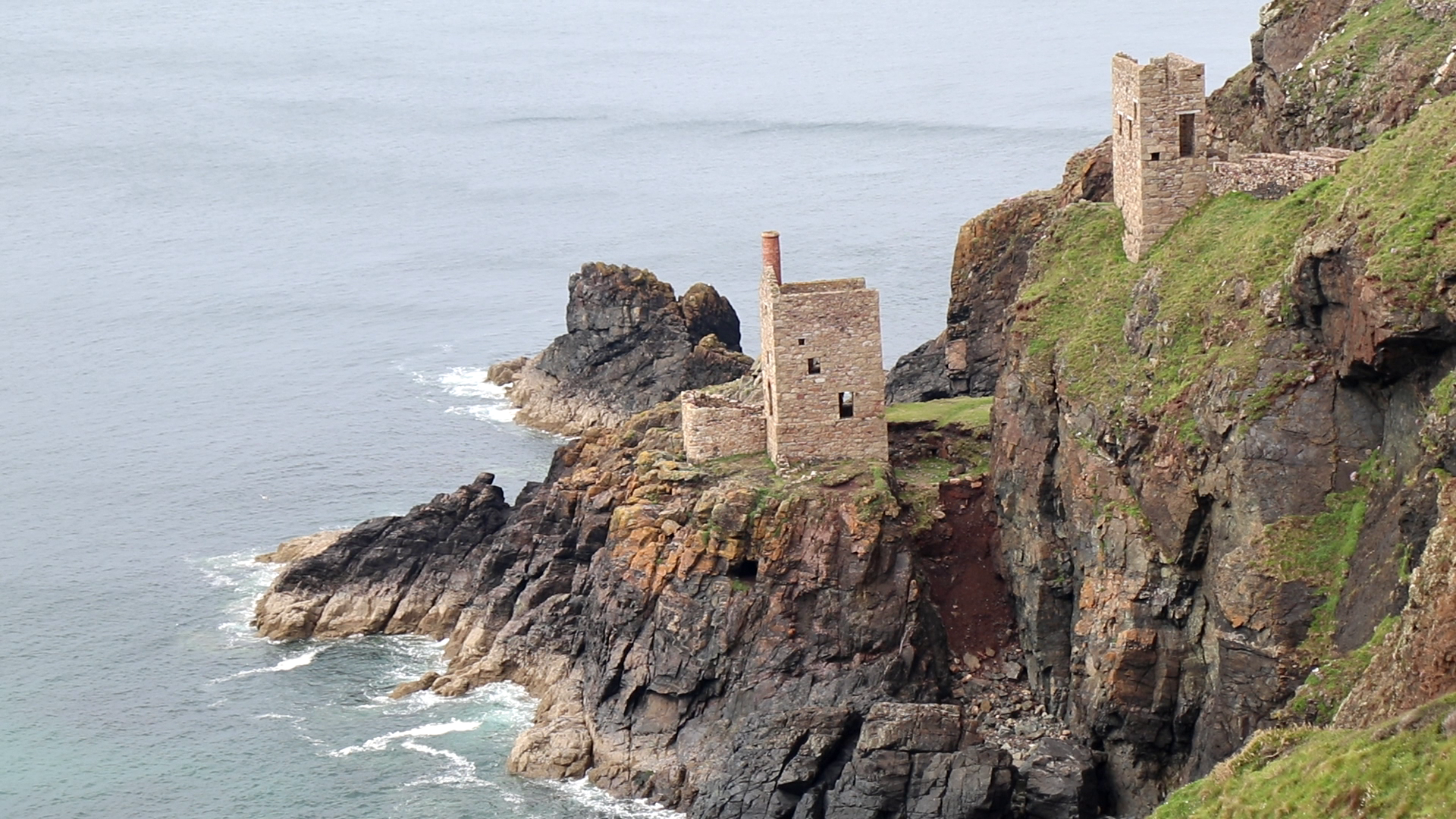
- Engine houses at Crown Mines

- Location within Cornwall
- 50°8′24″N 5°41′27″W
- Type: industrial heritage, mine

Site notes
- Owner: National Trust

UNESCO World Heritage Site
- Type: Cultural
- Criteria: ii, iii, iv
- Designated: 2006 (30th session)
- Part of: Cornwall and West Devon Mining Landscape
- Reference no.: 1215
- Region: List of World Heritage Sites in Western Europe

Listed Building – Grade II
- Official name: The Count House, Botallack Mine north west of Botallack
- Designated: 21 September 1973
- Reference no.: 1159591

Listed Building – Grade II
- Official name: The Crowns Engine Houses
- Designated: 19 March 1979
- Reference no.: 1143267

Scheduled monument
- Official name: Tin mine calciner at Botallack Mine
- Reference no.: 1004280

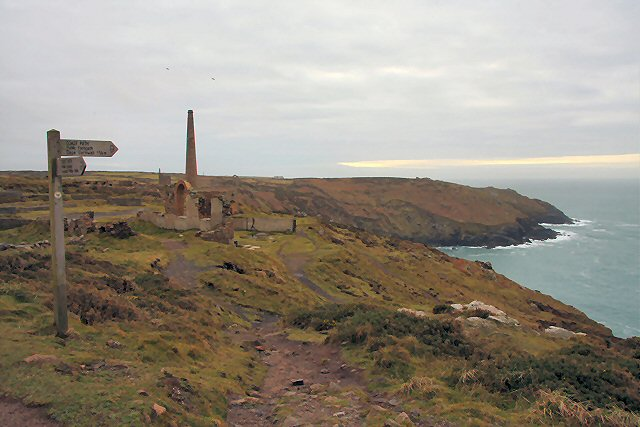
The South West Coast Path at Botallack

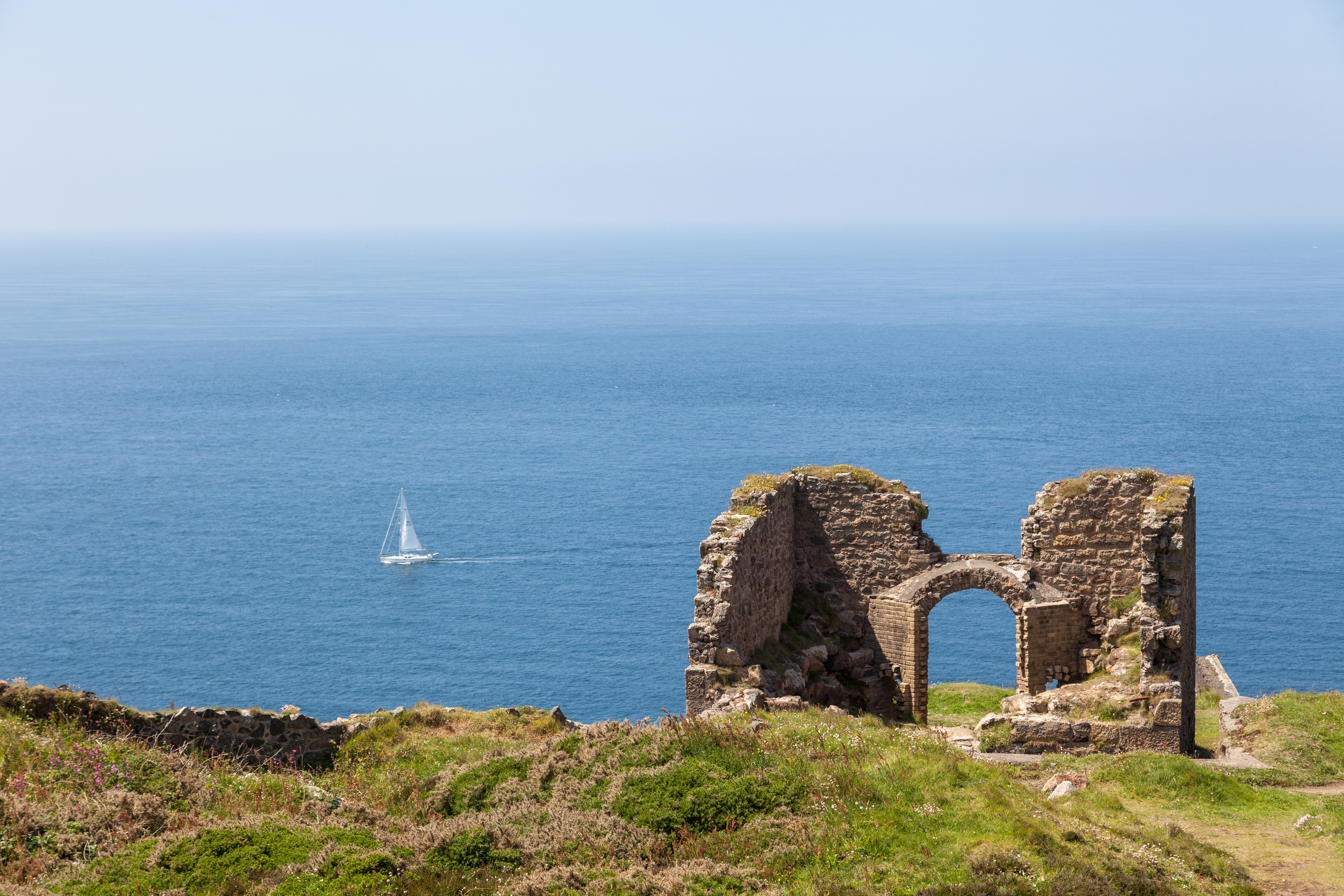
Ruins at Botallack Mine 2014

The Botallack Mine (Cornish: Hwel Bostalek) is a former mine in Botallack in the west of Cornwall, UK. Since 2006 it has been part of the UNESCO World Heritage Site – Cornwall and West Devon Mining Landscape. The mine is within the Aire Point to Carrick Du Site of Special Scientific Interest (SSSI) and the South West Coast Path passes along the cliff.

== Location ==
The village of Botallack is on the B3306 road, in a former tin and copper mining area between the town of St Just in Penwith and the village of Pendeen.

== History ==
Botallack was a submarine mine with tunnels extending under the sea, in places for half a mile. Over its recorded lifetime the mine produced around 14,500 tonnes of tin, 20,000 tonnes of copper, and 1,500 tonnes of arsenic. An estimated 1.5 million tonnes of waste would have been dug up with the minerals. It is unclear how far back mining activity goes in this location. Early records date from the 1500s. Some archaeological evidence points to mining here in the Roman era or even as far back as the Bronze Age.

Nicholas Boynes was captain of the mine in the early 18th-century and opened a "deep adit level", which was driven to the Corpus Christi lode in the higher mine. The first steam-engine was put to work at Carnyorth Moor (later part of the Botallack sett) in either 1795 or about 1810, depending on the source. In the first half of the 19th-century, the average price of Botallack tin was £64 4s a ton. The abolition of tin duty of 4s per 120 lbs to the Duke of Cornwall in 1838 helped to keep the mine operating despite a decline in the price of tin to £45 per ton. In the 1860s a new diagonal shaft was dug. A visit by the Prince and Princess of Wales in 1865, when they descended the shaft, created a mini-boom in tourism, causing the mine operators to charge visitors a guinea per person.

An increasing supply of tin – initially from Malaysia, Banka Island, and Sumatra, and in the 1870s onwards from Australia – along with a fall in demand for tinplate in the American market, caused the price of tin to fall, causing many Cornish mines to close. The managers decided in January 1883 to stop the Botallack and Crowns engines, because the number of men employed below ground was not sufficient to meet the costs of keeping the engines going. On 2 October 1883 the recently renewed setts, which extended over 2 miles (3.2 km) – comprising Wheal Cock, the Crowns, Carnyorth and Higher Mine – were put up for auction as a "going concern". It included four pumping and three winding engines, two steam stamps, plus other appliances. At the auction it was stated that the mine ″... only needs from £20,000 to £25,000 to be put in good working order, ...″ There were no bids for the mine.

The following shafts were working in 1884,

- Botallack engine-shaft, 220 fathoms (1,320 ft; 400 m) deep and worked with a 30 inches (760 mm) cylinder
- Crowns engine-shaft, 130 fathoms (780 ft; 240 m) deep and worked with a 36 inches (910 mm) cylinder
- Wheal Cock engine-shaft, 160 fathoms (960 ft; 290 m) deep and worked with a 30 inches (760 mm) cylinder
- Carnyorth engine-shaft, 130 fathoms (780 ft; 240 m) deep and worked with a 30 inches (760 mm) cylinder
- Wheal Cock skip-shaft, 170 fathoms (1,020 ft; 310 m) deep
- Botallack skip-shaft, 205 fathoms (1,230 ft; 375 m) deep
- Carnyorth skip-shaft, 124 fathoms (744 ft; 227 m) deep
- Wheal Hazzard skip-shaft, 100 fathoms (600 ft; 180 m) deep
- Chy Cornish skip-shaft, 100 fathoms (600 ft; 180 m) deep
- Pearce's skip-shaft, 130 fathoms (780 ft; 240 m) deep
- Bullion skip-shaft, 185 fathoms (1,110 ft; 338 m) deep
- Durloe skip-shaft, 70 fathoms (420 ft; 130 m) deep
- Rodd's skip-shaft, 60 fathoms (360 ft; 110 m) deep
- Boscawen diagonal-shaft, about 500 fathoms (3,000 ft; 910 m) long, perpendicular depth 240 fathoms (1,440 ft; 440 m) and 300 fathoms (1,800 ft; 550 m) under the sea
- Approximately 10 other shafts varying in depth from a few fathoms to 50 fathoms (300 ft; 91 m) deep.

Other engines,

- Botallack stamping-engine, 30 inches (760 mm) cylinder
- Carnyorth stamping-engine, 24 inches (610 mm) cylinder
- Carn whim, 27 inches (690 mm) cylinder
- Davy's whim (Botallack), 26.5 inches (670 mm) cylinder
- Carnyorth, 22 inches (560 mm) cylinder
- saw-mill, 14 inches (360 mm) cylinder
- air-compressor, 14 inches (360 mm) cylinder.

A total of 265 workers were employed and the wage was approximately £800 per month.

	Men	Boys	Girls	Total
Underground	140	20	0	160
Surface, dressing ore	18	20	17	55
Surface, other	45	2	3	50

The average monthly yield of the mine was about 19 tons of tin, 3 tons of copper and 4 tons of arsenic.

The mine closed in 1895 as a result of falling tin and copper prices.

The mining developments around Botallack form part of the St Just mining district's successful inclusion in the Cornwall and West Devon Mining Landscape World Heritage Site, which was inscribed in July 2006.

== Description ==
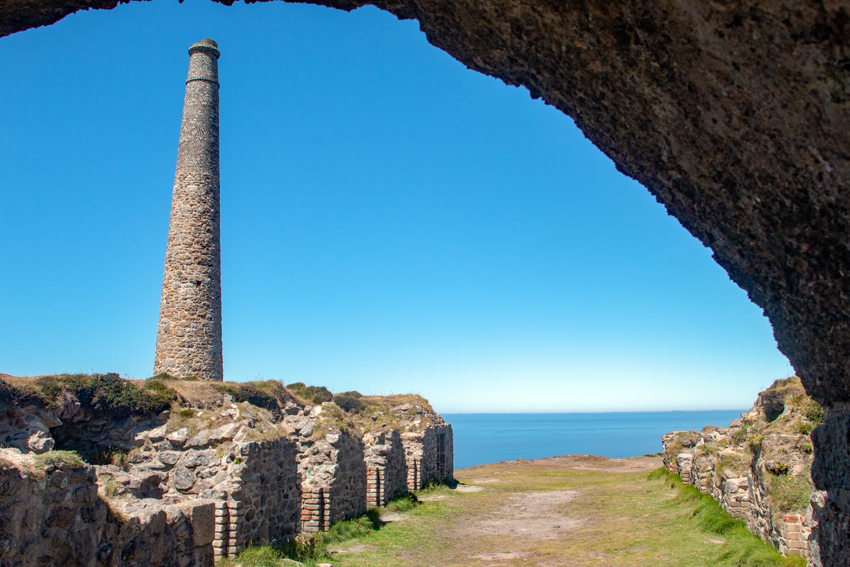
Arsenic labyrinth at Botallack

The engine houses in the Crowns section of Botallack Mine are set low down the cliffs north of Botallack. There are two engine houses and the remains of another pair on the cliff slopes above; the mine extends for about 400 metres out under the Atlantic ocean; the deepest shaft is 250 fathoms (about 500 metres) below sea level. The workings of Botallack Mine extend inland as far as the St Just to St Ives road, and at times included Wheal Cock further to the north-east.

The mine buildings on Botallack Cliffs are protected by the National Trust. There are two arsenic works opposite the Botallack Mine count house. At the top of the cliffs there is also the remains of one of the mine's arsenic-refining works.

The mineral Botallackite has its type locality here.

== Popular culture ==
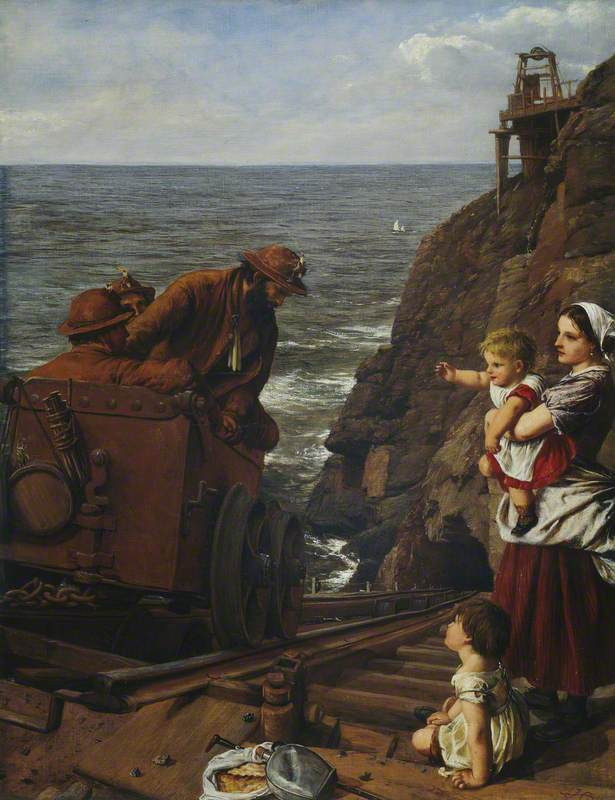
From Under the Sea by James Clarke Hook, 1864

The mine is the setting for R. M. Ballantyne's Deep Down.

The 1970s BBC television series Poldark was filmed partly in Botallack, using Manor Farm as Nampara. More recently, filming for the new Poldark series also took place here.

== Mineral statistics ==
From Robert Hunt's Mineral Statistics of the United Kingdom.

Copper production (1845–1895)
Year(s)	Ore (tons)	Metal (tons)	Value (£)
1845	1,274.00	140.70	9,656.50
1846	513.00	58.80	3,338.10
1847	251.00	23.90	1,551.10
1848	75.00	7.00	370.80
1850	147.00	16.40	1,099.40
1851	212.00	21.90	1,457.70
1852	629.00	60.90	5,036.50
1853	1,001.00	93.40	9,248.40
1854	1,453.00	203.80	21,635.50
1855	973.00	133.80	14,311.20
1856	651.00	83.30	8,201.60
1857	985.00	110.10	11,427.00
1858	576.00	70.20	6,680.80
1859	330.00	42.00	4,038.50
1860	331.00	46.70	4,423.90
1861	509.00	51.80	4,642.90
1862	539.00	48.00	3,871.70
1863	541.00	48.90	3,783.00
1864	217.00	16.00	1,307.10
1865	369.00	40.30	3,244.70
1866	467.00	61.70	4,296.30
1867	434.00	50.80	3,586.30
1868	434.00	53.90	3,596.30
1869	83.00	9.10	584.80
1870	32.00	3.60	213.60
1872	56.00	10.20	740.30
1873	55.00	12.70	844.00
1874	161.00	26.10	1,942.50
1875	428.00	62.90	4,597.30
1876	430.00	53.20	3,686.10
1877	136.70	18.60	1,101.60
1878	158.10	19.40	963.10
1879	131.20	16.10	897.20
1880	129.00	14.30	847.00
1881	187.60	21.50	1,178.10
1882	32.00	3.10	238.00
1883	64.00	6.30	575.00
1884	18.00	..	175.00
1885	7.00	..	72.00
1886	9.00	..	76.00
1887	10.00	..	107.00
1888	15.00	..	188.00
1889	43.00	..	312.00
1891	9.00	..	136.00
1894	12.00	..	136.00
1895	18.00	..	90.00

Tin production (1853–1985)
Year(s)	Black (tons)	Tin (tons)	Value (£)
1853	147.40	..	8,656.80
1854	147.10	..	10,842.10
1855	142.70	..	9,590.20
1856	149.00	..	13,285.50
1857	172.30	..	14,254.60
1858	202.20	..	12,861.60
1859	153.10	..	12,308.30
1860	183.10	..	15,302.90
1861	201.60	..	15,233.60
1862	440.10	..	30,645.20
1863	413.50	..	28,967.60
1864	425.70	..	28,857.20
1865	390.10	..	22,107.40
1866	342.80	..	17,620.90
1867	202.50	..	10,632.50
1868	375.30	..	21,381.70
1869	525.20	..	38,268.60
1870	446.90	..	33,760.50
1871	497.70	..	39,552.00
1872	391.70	..	34,224.10
1873	352.50	..	27,392.20
1874	401.50	..	22,717.40
1875	358.30	..	18,556.20
1876	323.50	..	14,318.00
1877	433.70	..	17,577.50
1878	477.80	..	16,882.00
1879	501.10	..	20,355.50
1880	389.00	..	20,557.00
1881	245.40	162.60	13,572.50
1882	210.00	147.00	12,659.00
1883	192.00	..	10,226.00
1884	231.10	..	10,389.00
1885	271.20	..	12,886.00
1886	318.80	..	17,960.00
1887	338.50	..	21,586.00
1888	284.20	..	18,259.00
1889	334.20	..	17,757.00
1890	415.50	..	22,476.00
1891	361.50	..	18,882.00
1892	350.00	..	18,468.00
1893	402.00	..	19,164.00
1894	390.00	..	15,424.00
1895	65.50	..	2,070.00
1896	no-details	..	..
1899	36.00	..	2,208.00
1900	29.00	..	1,769.00
1901	62.00	..	3,410.00
1902	53.00	..	3,445.00
1903	48.40	..	3,144.00
1904	54.00	..	2,921.00
1905	50.60	..	3,872.00
1906	49.50	..	4,784.00
1908	44.70	..	3,346.00
1909	135.40	..	10,398.00
1910	86.90	..	7,506.00
1911	95.50	..	10,453.00
1912	121.50	..	15,669.00
1913	156.40	..	18,498.00
1914	37.10	..	3,370.00
1914	no-details	..	..
1985	no-details	..	..

Arsenic production (1875–1895)
Year(s)	Ore (tons)	Value (£)
1875	16.20	71.60
1876	97.00	353.20
1877	135.40	472.80
1878	72.60	97.90
1879	114.90	378.00
1880	60.00	306.00
1881	69.30	264.00
1882	72.00	266.00
1883	69.00	254.00
1884	78.60	312.00
1885	41.80	167.00
1886	35.00	140.00
1887	35.00	155.00
1888	40.00	178.00
1889	95.00	382.00
1890	108.00	512.00
1891	79.00	390.00
1892	94.00	462.00
1893	95.00	486.00
1894	98.00	635.00
1895	20.00	100.00

Employment (1878–1913)
Year(s)	Total	Overground	Underground
1878	409	158	251
1879	407	153	254
1880	312	110	202
1881	289	105	184
1882	297	97	200
1883	215	80	135
1884	196	66	130
1885	256	90	166
1886	279	97	182
1887	292	104	188
1888	315	126	189
1889	409	172	237
1890	405	168	237
1891	349	153	196
1892	369	156	213
1893	367	161	206
1894	249	116	133
1895	6	6	..
1899	40	33	7
1900	46	38	8
1901	43	38	5
1902	40	35	5
1904	42	42	..
1905	37	37	..
1906	73	65	8
1907	200	125	75
1908	240	132	108
1909	242	133	109
1910	233	111	122
1911	276	101	175
1912	268	110	158
1913	275	94	181

== Gallery ==
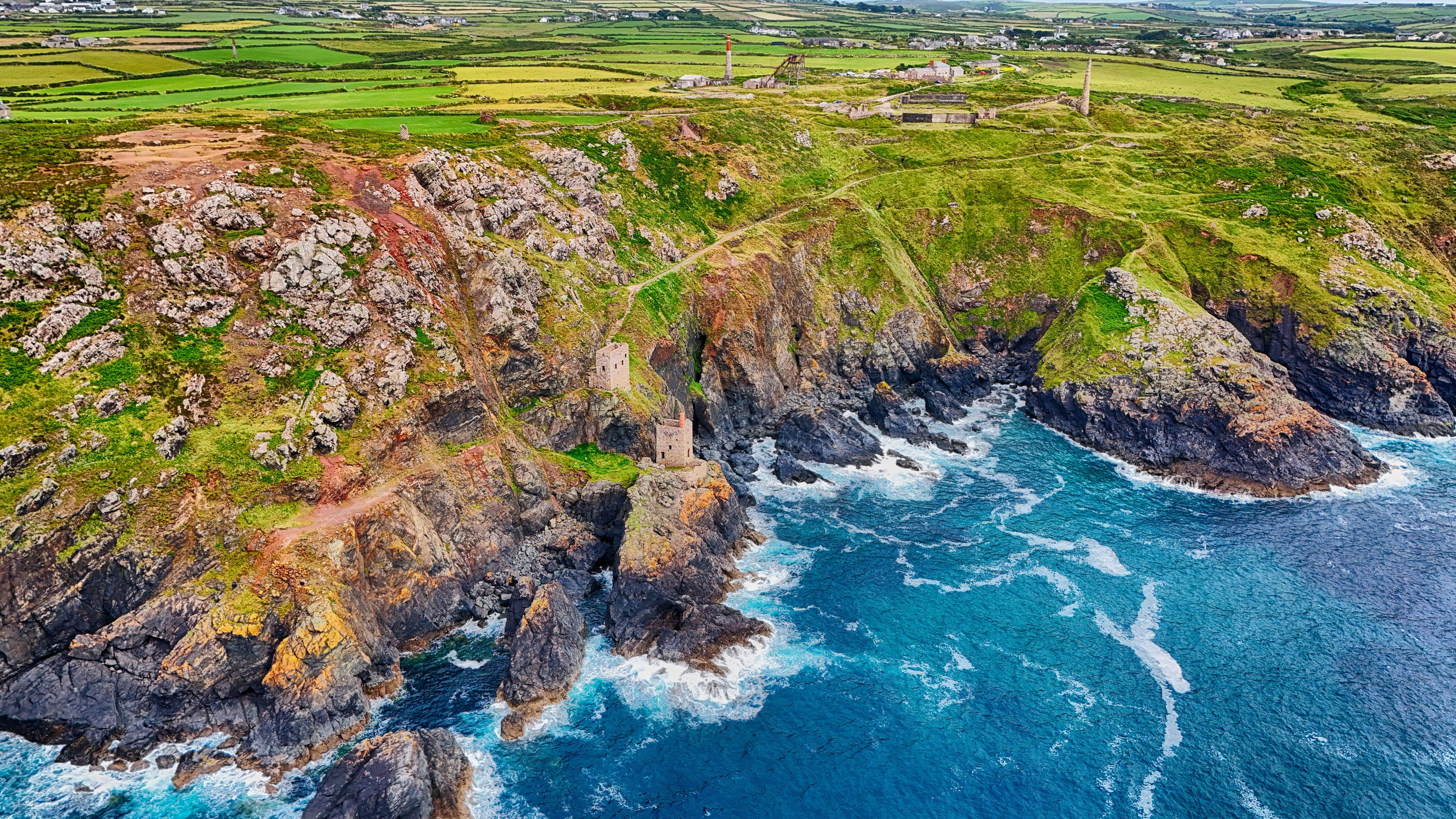

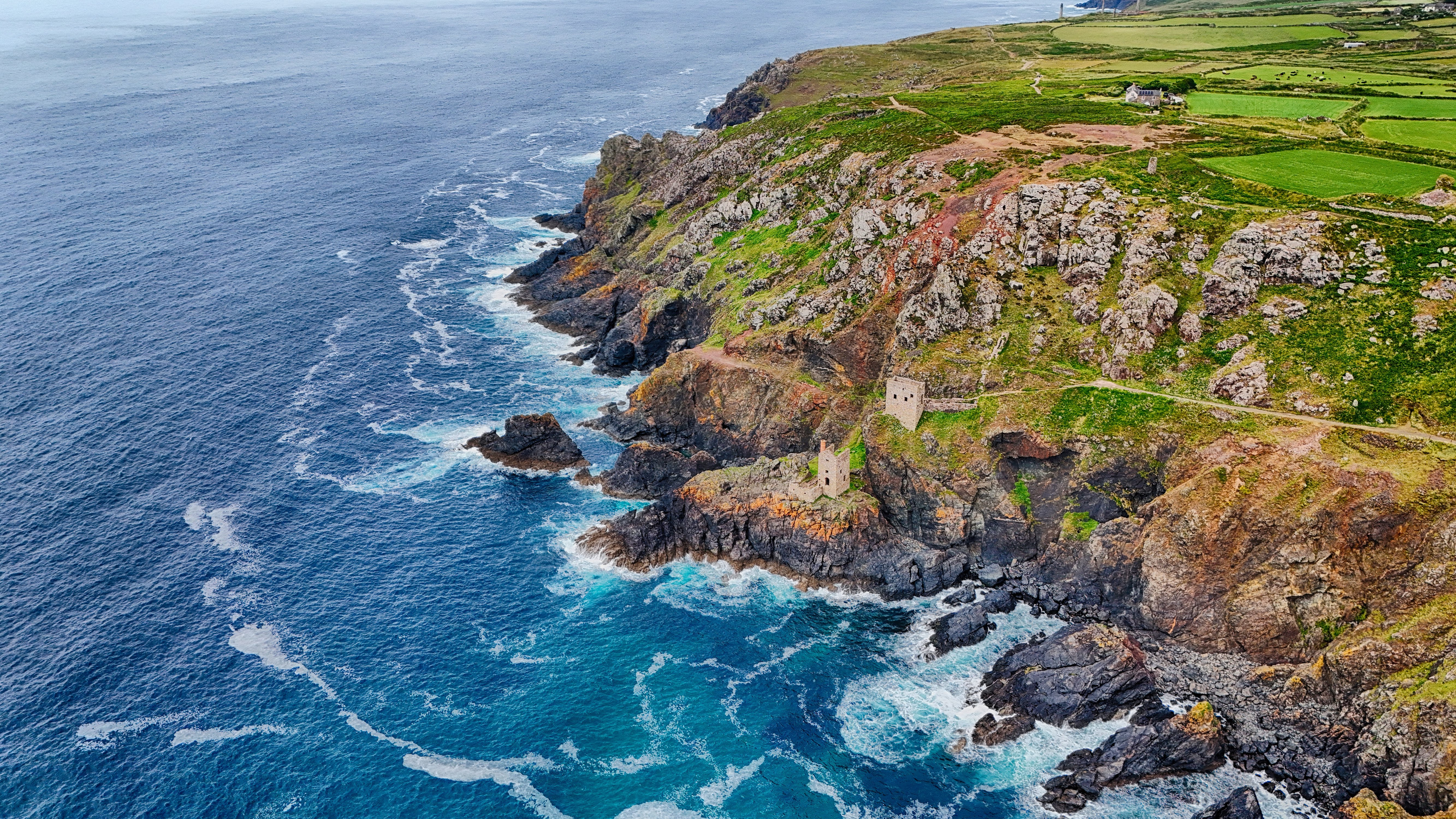

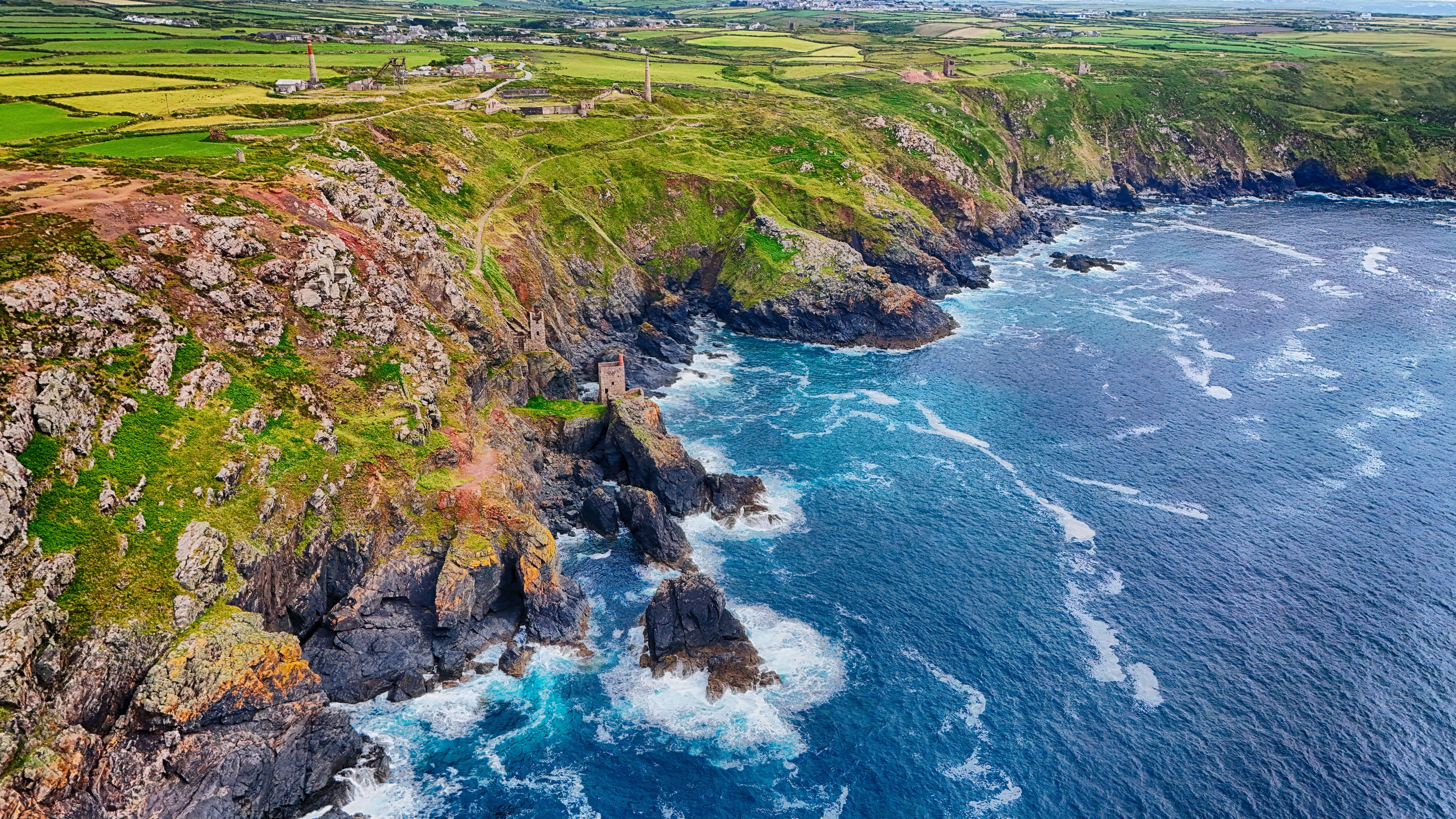

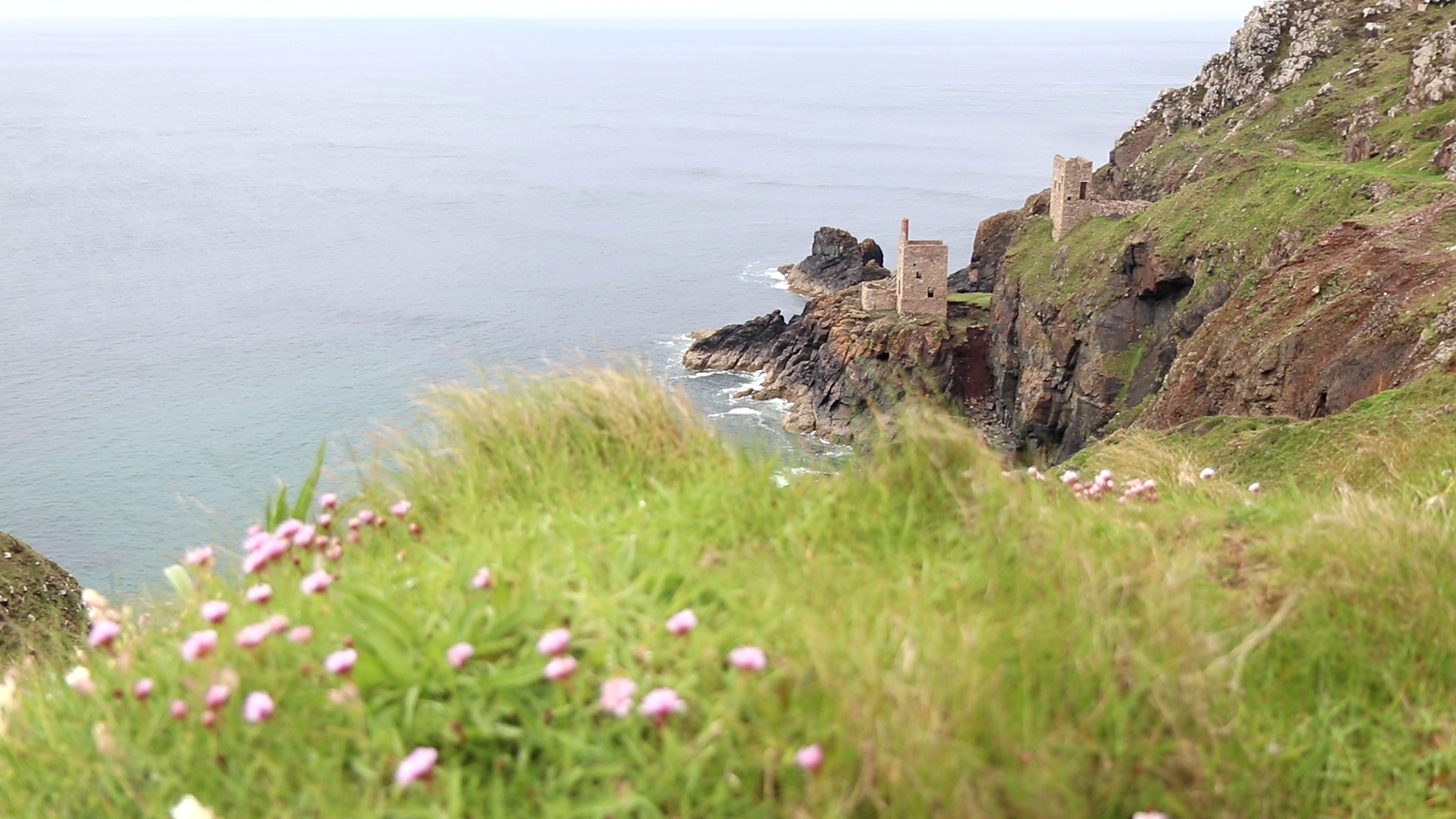

== See also ==
- Levant Mine and Beam Engine
- Geevor Tin Mine
- Consolidated Mines
- Dolcoath mine
