= Halide mineral =

Minerals with a dominant fluoride, chloride, bromide, or iodide anion

Halide minerals are those minerals with a dominant halide anion (F^{−}, Cl^{−}, Br^{−} and I^{−}). Complex halide minerals may also have polyatomic anions.

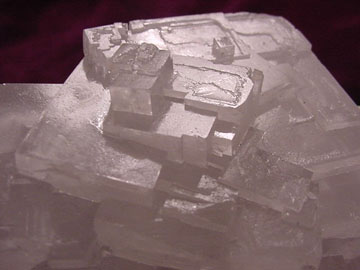
Halite

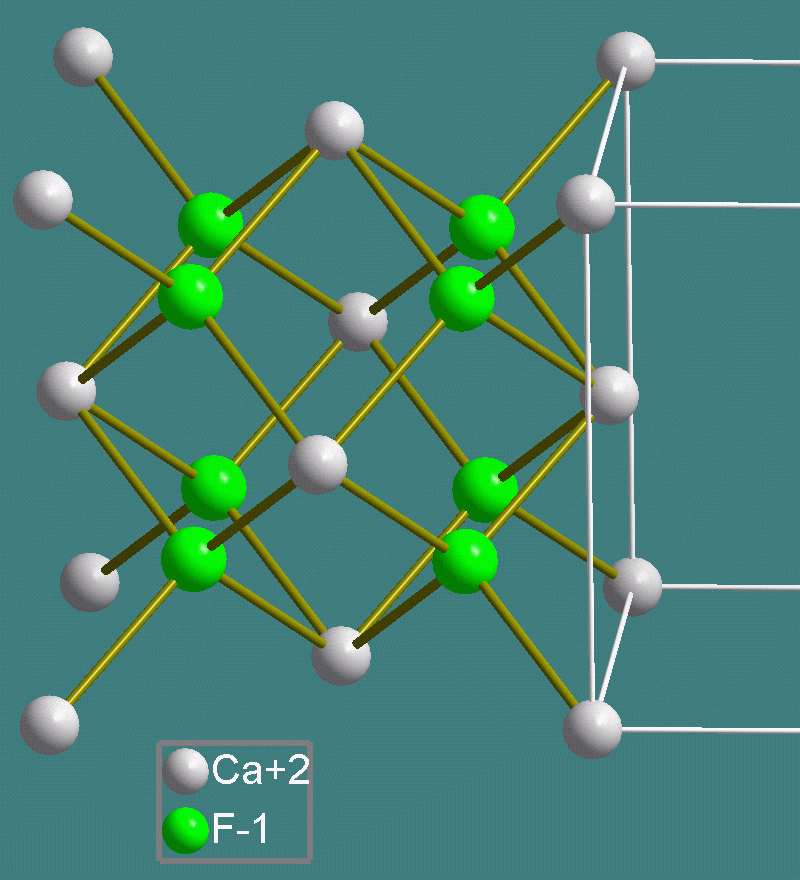
Fluorite structure

Examples include the following:

- Atacamite Cu_{2}Cl(OH)_{3}
- Avogadrite (K,Cs)BF
- Bararite (β)(NH_{4})_{2}SiF_{6}
- Bischofite MgCl_{2}·6H_{2}O
- Brüggenite Ca(IO_{3})_{2}(H_{2}O)
- Calomel HgCl
- Carnallite KMgCl_{3}·6H_{2}O
- Carnallite KMgCl·6H_{2}O
- Cerargyrite/Horn silver AgCl
- Chlorargyrite AgCl, bromargyrite AgBr, and iodargyrite AgI
- Cryolite Na_{3}AlF_{6}
- Cryptohalite (a)(NH_{4})_{2}SiF_{6}
- Dietzeite Ca_{2}(IO_{3})_{2}CrO_{4}
- Eglestonite Hg_{4}OCl_{2}
- Embolite AgCl+AgBr
- Eriochalcite CuCl_{2}·2H_{2}O
- Fluorite CaF_{2}
- Halite NaCl
- Lautarite Ca(IO_{3})_{2}
- Marshite CuI
- Miersite AgI
- Nantokite CuCl
- Sal Ammoniac NH_{4}Cl
- Sylvite KCl
- Terlinguaite Hg_{2}OCl
- Tolbachite CuCl_{2}
- Villiaumite NaF
- Yttrocerite (Ca,Y,Ce)F_{2}
- Yttrofluorite (Ca,Y)F_{2}
- Zavaritskite (BiO)F

Many of these minerals are water-soluble and are often found in arid areas in crusts and other deposits as are various borates, nitrates, iodates, bromates and the like. Others, such as the fluorite group, are not water-soluble. As a collective whole, simple halide minerals (containing fluorine through iodine, alkali metals, alkaline Earth metals, in addition to other metals/cations) occur abundantly at the surface of the Earth in a variety of geologic settings. More complex minerals as shown below are also found.

== Commercially significant halide minerals ==
Two commercially important halide minerals are halite and fluorite. The former is a major source of sodium chloride, in parallel with sodium chloride extracted from sea water or brine wells. Fluorite is a major source of hydrogen fluoride, complementing the supply obtained as a byproduct of the production of fertilizer. Carnallite and bischofite are important sources of magnesium. Natural cryolite was historically required for the production of aluminium, however, currently most cryolite used is produced synthetically.

Many of the halide minerals occur in marine evaporite deposits. Other geologic occurrences include arid environments such as deserts. The Atacama Desert has large quantities of halide minerals as well as chlorates, iodates, oxyhalides, nitrates, borates and other water-soluble minerals. Not only do those minerals occur in subsurface geologic deposits, they also form crusts on the Earth's surface due to the low rainfall (the Atacama is the world's driest desert as well as one of the oldest at 25 million years of age).

== Nickel–Strunz Classification -03- Halides ==
IMA-CNMNC proposes a new hierarchical scheme (Mills et al., 2009). This list uses the Classification of Nickel–Strunz (mindat.org, 10 ed, pending publication).

Abbreviations

- REE: rare-earth element (Sc, Y, La, Ce, Pr, Nd, Pm, Sm, Eu, Gd, Tb, Dy, Ho, Er, Tm, Yb, Lu)
- PGE: platinum-group element (Ru, Rh, Pd, Os, Ir, Pt)
- * : discredited (IMA/CNMNC status)
- ? : questionable/doubtful (IMA/CNMNC status)

Regarding 03.C Aluminofluorides, 06 Borates, 08 Vanadates (04.H V^{[5,6]} Vanadates), 09 Silicates:

- neso-: insular (from Greek νῆσος nêsos, "island")
- soro-: grouped (from Greek σωρός sōrós, "heap, pile, mound")
- cyclo-: ringed (from Greek κύκλος kúklos, "circle")
- ino-: chained (from Greek ίνα ína, "fibre", [from Ancient Greek ἴς])
- phyllo-: sheeted (from Greek φῠ́λλον phúllon, "leaf")
- tecto-: of three-dimensional framework (from Greek τεκτονικός tektōnikós, "of building")

Nickel–Strunz code scheme: NN.XY.##x

- NN: Nickel–Strunz mineral class number
- X: Nickel–Strunz mineral division letter
- Y: Nickel–Strunz mineral family letter
- ##x: Nickel–Strunz mineral/group number; x an add-on letter

=== Class: halides ===
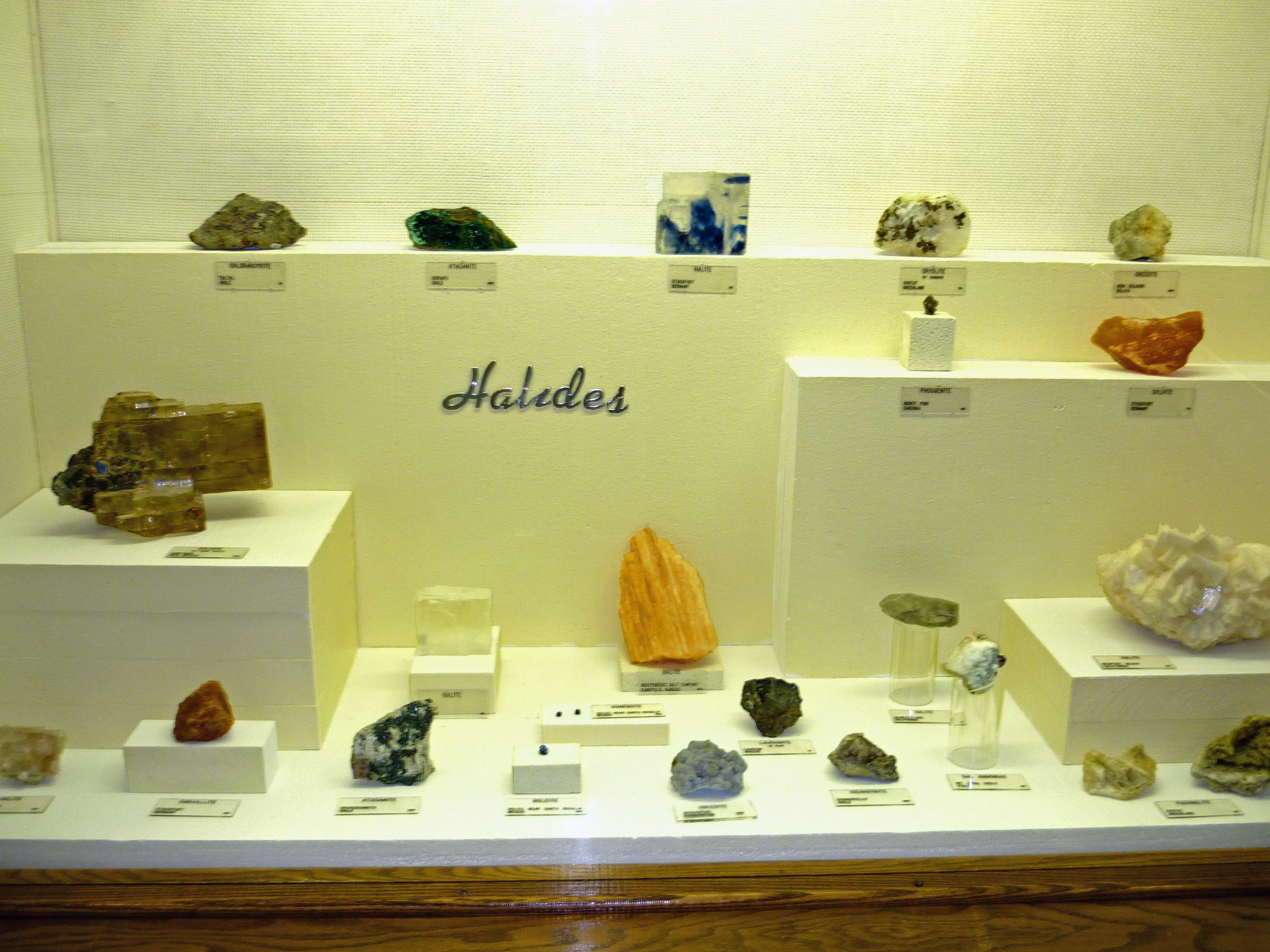
Halide specimens at Museum of Geology, South Dakota

- 03.A Simple halides, without H_{2}O
  - 03.AA M:X = 1:1, 2:3, 3:5, etc.: Panichiite; 05 Nantokite, 05 Marshite, 05 Miersite; 10 Iodargyrite, 10 Tocornalite; 15 Bromargyrite, 15 Embolite*, 15 Chlorargyrite; 20 Carobbiite, 20 Griceite, 20 Halite, 20 Sylvite, 20 Villiaumite; 25 Sal ammoniac, 25 Lafossaite; 30 Calomel, 30 Kuzminite, 30 Moschelite; 35 Neighborite; 40 Chlorocalcite, 45 Kolarite, 50 Radhakrishnaite; 55 Hephaistosite, 55 Challacolloite
  - 03.AB M:X = 1:2: 05 Tolbachite, 10 Coccinite, 15 Sellaite; 20 Chloromagnesite*, 20 Lawrencite, 20 Scacchite; 25 Frankdicksonite, 25 Fluorite; 30 Tveitite-(Y); 35 Gagarinite-(Y); 35 Zajacite-(Ce)
  - 03.AC M:X = 1:3: 05 Zharchikhite, 10 Molysite; 15 Fluocerite-(Ce), 15 Fluocerite-(La), 20 Gananite
- 03.B Simple Halides, with H_{2}O
  - 03.BA M:X = 1:1 and 2:3: 05 Hydrohalite, 10 Carnallite
  - 03.BB M:X = 1:2: 05 Eriochalcite, 10 Rokuhnite, 15 Bischofite, 20 Nickelbischofite, 25 Sinjarite, 30 Antarcticite, 35 Tachyhydrite
  - 03.BC M:X = 1:3: 05 Chloraluminite
  - 03.BD Simple Halides with H_{2}O and additional OH: 05 Cadwaladerite, 10 Lesukite, 15 Korshunovskite, 20 Nepskoeite, 25 Koenenite
- 03.C Complex Halides
  - 03.C: Steropesite, IMA2008-032, IMA2008-039
  - 03.CA Borofluorides: 05 Ferruccite; 10 Avogadrite, 10 Barberiite
  - 03.CB Neso-aluminofluorides: 05 Cryolithionite; 15 Cryolite, 15 Elpasolite, 15 Simmonsite; 20 Colquiriite, 25 Weberite, 30 Karasugite, 35 Usovite; 40 Pachnolite, 40 Thomsenolite; 45 Carlhintzeite, 50 Yaroslavite
  - 03.CC Soro-aluminofluorides: 05 Gearksutite; 10 Acuminite, 10 Tikhonenkovite; 15 Artroeite; 20 Calcjarlite, 20 Jarlite, 20 Jorgensenite
  - 03.CD Ino-aluminofluorides: 05 Rosenbergite, 10 Prosopite
  - 03.CE Phyllo-aluminofluorides: 05 Chiolite
  - 03.CF Tekto-aluminofluorides: 05 Ralstonite, 10 Boldyrevite?, 15 Bogvadite
  - 03.CG Aluminofluorides with CO_{3}, SO_{4}, PO_{4}: 05 Stenonite; 10 Chukhrovite-(Nd), 10 Chukhrovite-(Ce), 10 Chukhrovite-(Y), 10 Meniaylovite; 15 Creedite, 20 Boggildite, 25 Thermessaite
  - 03.CH: 05 Malladrite, 10 Bararite; 15 Cryptohalite, 15 Hieratite; 20 Demartinite, 25 Knasibfite
  - 03.CJ With MX_{6} complexes; M = Fe, Mn, Cu: 05 Chlormanganokalite, 05 Rinneite; 10 Erythrosiderite, 10 Kremersite; 15 Mitscherlichite, 20 Douglasite, 30 Zirklerite
- 03.D Oxyhalides, Hydroxyhalides and Related Double Halides
  - 03.DA With Cu, etc., without Pb: 05 Melanothallite; 10a Atacamite, 10a Kempite, 10a Hibbingite, 10b Botallackite, 10b Clinoatacamite, 10b Belloite, 10c Gillardite, 10c Kapellasite, 10c Haydeeite, 10c Paratacamite, 10c Herbertsmithite; 15 Claringbullite, 20 Simonkolleite; 25 Buttgenbachite, 25 Connellite; 30 Abhurite, 35 Ponomarevite; 40 Calumetite, 40 Anthonyite; 45 Khaidarkanite, 50 Bobkingite, 55 Avdoninite, 60 Droninoite
  - 03.DB With Pb, Cu, etc.: 05 Diaboleite, 10 Pseudoboleite, 15 Boleite, 20 Cumengite, 25 Bideauxite, 30 Chloroxiphite, 35 Hematophanite; 40 Asisite, 40 Parkinsonite; 45 Murdochite, 50 Yedlinite
  - 03.DC With Pb (As, Sb, Bi), without Cu: 05 Laurionite, 05 Paralaurionite; 10 Fiedlerite, 15 Penfieldite, 20 Laurelite; 25 Zhangpeishanite, 25 Matlockite, 25 Rorisite, 25 Daubreeite, 25 Bismoclite, 25 Zavaritskite; 30 Nadorite, 30 Perite; 35 Aravaipaite, 37 Calcioaravaipaite, 40 Thorikosite, 45 Mereheadite, 50 Blixite, 55 Pinalite, 60 Symesite; 65 Ecdemite, 65 Heliophyllite; 70 Mendipite, 75 Damaraite, 80 Onoratoite, 85 Cotunnite, 90 Pseudocotunnite, 95 Barstowite
  - 03.DD With Hg: 05 Eglestonite, 05 Kadyrelite; 10 Poyarkovite, 15 Hanawaltite, 20 Terlinguaite, 25 Pinchite; 30 Mosesite, 30 Gianellaite; 35 Kleinite, 40 Tedhadleyite, 45 Vasilyevite, 50 Aurivilliusite, 55 Terlinguacreekite, 60 Kelyanite, 65 Comancheite
  - 03.DE With Rare-Earth Elements: 05 Haleniusite-(La)
- 03.X Unclassified Strunz Halogenides
  - 03.XX Unknown: 00 Hydrophilite?, 00 Hydromolysite?, 00 Yttrocerite*, 00 Lorettoite?, 00 IMA2009-014, 00 IMA2009-015
