= Sodium hexafluoroaluminate =

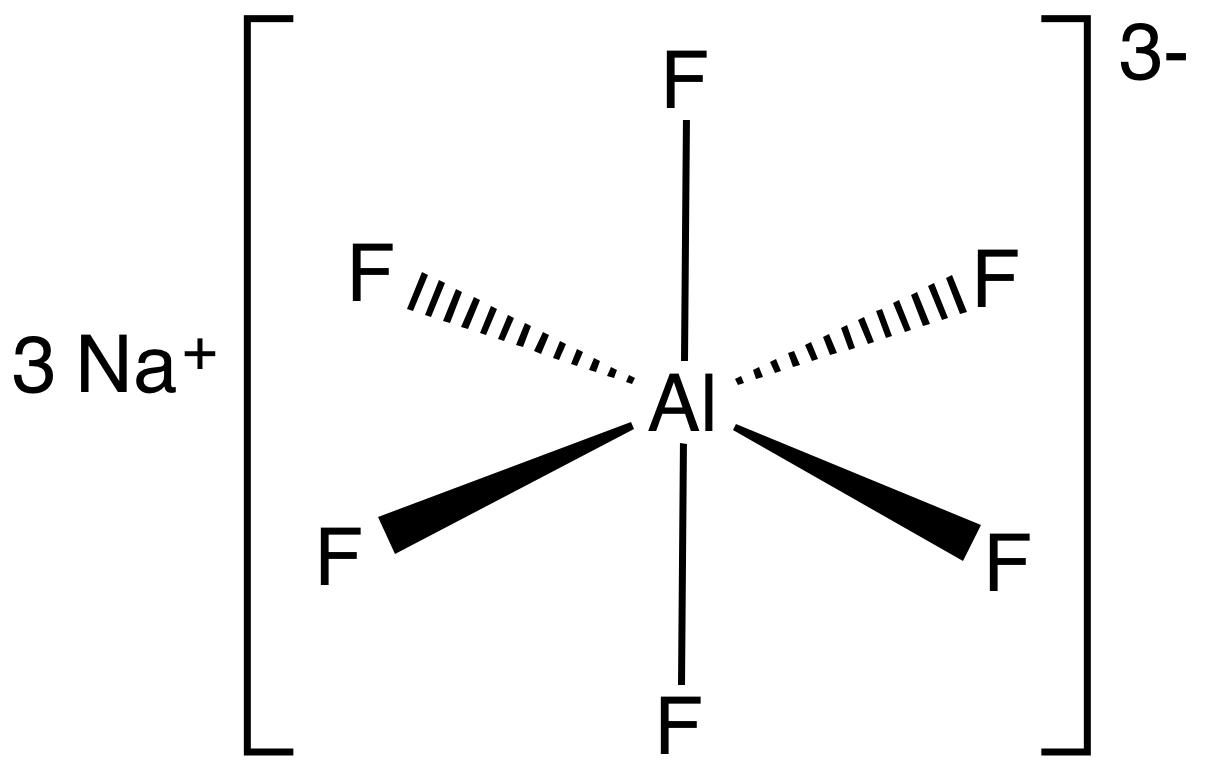
- Sodium aluminium hexafluoride unit cell

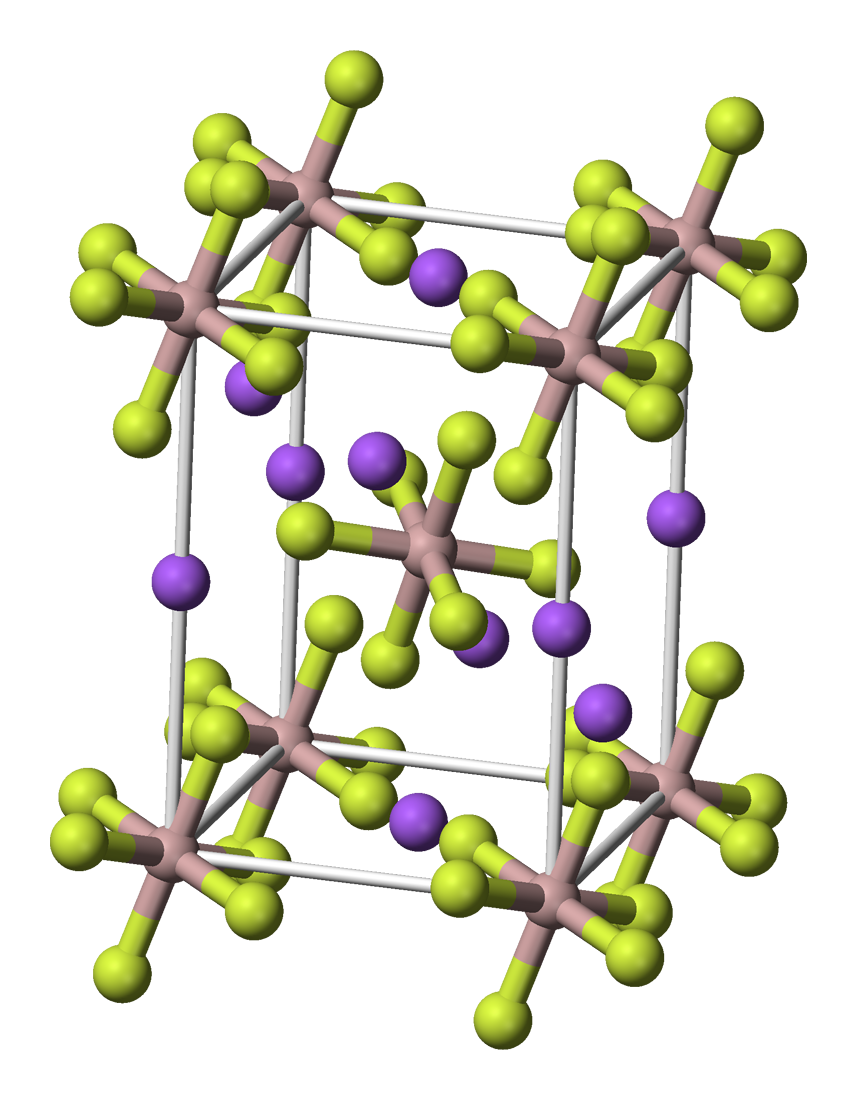
- Sodium aluminium hexafluoride unit cell

Names
- Other names Sodium fluoroaluminate Cryolite; Kryolite; Aluminate(3-), hexafluoro-, trisodium, (OC-6-11)-

Identifiers
CAS Number	13775-53-6
3D model (JSmol)	Interactive image
ChEBI	CHEBI:39289
ChemSpider	11431435
ECHA InfoCard	100.035.575
PubChem CID	159692
UNII	5ZIS914RQ9
CompTox Dashboard (EPA)	DTXSID90872955
- InChI: InChI=1S/Al.6FH.3Na/h;6*1H;;;/q+3;;;;;;;3*+1/p-6 Key: REHXRBDMVPYGJX-UHFFFAOYSA-H; InChI=1/Al.6FH.3Na/h;6*1H;;;/q+3;;;;;;;3*+1/p-6/rAlF6.3Na/c2-1(3,4,5,6)7;;;/q-3;3*+1 Key: REHXRBDMVPYGJX-ZWHJLPLDAC
- SMILES: [Na+].[Na+].[Na+].F[Al-3](F)(F)(F)(F)F

Properties
Chemical formula	Na_{3}AlF_{6}
Molar mass	209.94 g/mol
Appearance	white solid
Density	2.9 g/cm^{3}, solid
Melting point	950 °C (1,740 °F; 1,220 K)
Boiling point	decomposes
Solubility in water	0.04% (20°C)
Vapor pressure	essentially 0

Hazards
- GHS labelling
Pictograms	(GHS08: Health hazard) (GHS07: Exclamation mark) (GHS09: Environmental hazard)
Signal word	Danger
Hazard statements	H332, H372, H411
Precautionary statements	P260
- Lethal dose or concentration (LD, LC)
LD_{Lo} (lowest published)	600 mg/kg (guinea pigs, oral)
- NIOSH (US health exposure limits)
PEL (Permissible)	TWA 2.5 mg/m^{3}
REL (Recommended)	TWA 2.5 mg/m^{3}
IDLH (Immediate danger)	250 mg/m^{3} (as F)
- Except where otherwise noted, data are given for materials in their standard state (at 25 °C [77 °F], 100 kPa). verify (what is ?) Infobox references

Sodium hexafluoroaluminate is an inorganic compound with formula Na_{3}AlF_{6}. This white solid, discovered in 1799 by Peder Christian Abildgaard (1740–1801), occurs naturally as the mineral cryolite and is used extensively in the industrial production of aluminium. The compound is the sodium (Na^{+}) salt of the hexafluoroaluminate (AlF_{6}^{3−}) ion.

== Production ==
Most cryolite is manufactured by a variety of related pathways. One route entails combining sodium aluminate and hydrofluoric acid:

Na_{3}Al(OH)_{6} + 6 HF → Na_{3}AlF_{6} + 6 H_{2}O

Other routes include:

6 HF + 3 NaAlO_{2} → Na_{3}AlF_{6} + Al_{2}O_{3} + 3 H_{2}O
4 AlF_{3} + 3 Na_{2}O → 2 Na_{3}AlF_{6} + Al_{2}O_{3}

Often the hexafluoroaluminic acid, which is recovered from phosphate mining, is the precursor in a two-step process beginning with neutralization with ammonia to give ammonium hexafluoroaluminate:

H_{3}AlF_{6} + 3 NH_{3} → (NH_{4})_{3}AlF_{6}
(NH_{4})_{3}AlF_{6} + 3 NaOH → Na_{3}AlF_{6} + 3 NH_{3} + 3 H_{2}O

The mineral form of sodium hexafluoroaluminate, which is called cryolite, was mined at Ivigtût on the west coast of Greenland until the deposit was depleted in 1987.

== Use ==
The dominant application of synthetic cryolite is as a solvent (or flux) for electrolysis of aluminium oxides such as bauxite. The conversion of aluminium oxides into metallic aluminium requires that the metal ions be dissolved so that they can accept the electrons provided in the electrolysis cell. A mixture of cryolite and some aluminium trifluoride is used as that solvent. Unlike typical solutions, this one requires temperatures approaching 1000 °C to melt.

Other uses include a whitener for enamels and an opacifier for glass.

== Structure ==
It adopts a perovskite-like structure. The AlF_{6}^{3−} centers are nearly idealized octahedra. Na^{+} occupy both six- and distorted 8-coordinate sites.

== Safety ==
The LD_{50} is 600 mg/kg for the comparable compound aluminium trifluoride. Cryolite is poorly soluble in water.

== Related compounds ==
- Chiolite ( Na_{5}Al_{3}F_{14}), another sodium fluoroaluminate.
