= Avogadrite =

Halide mineral

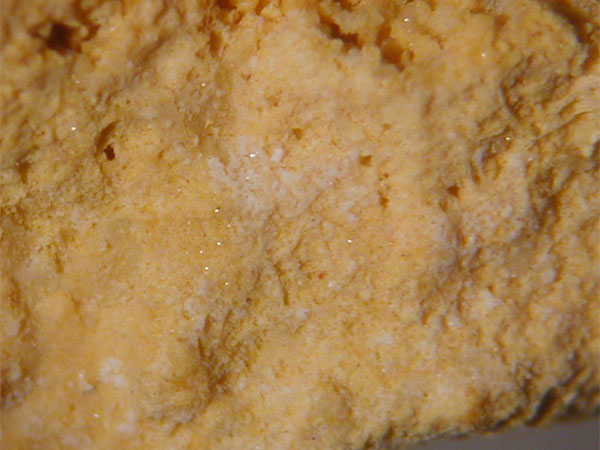
- Ferruccite (white) on avogadrite (yellow-brownish), picture size: 5 mm

General
- Category: Halide mineral
- Formula: (K,Cs)BF_{4}
- IMA symbol: Avg
- Strunz classification: 3.CA.10
- Crystal system: Orthorhombic
- Crystal class: Dipyramidal (mmm); H-M symbol: (2/m 2/m 2/m)
- Space group: Pnma
- Unit cell: a = 8.6588, b = 5.48 c = 7.0299 [Å]; Z = 4

Identification
- Color: Colorless to white, yellowish to reddish
- Crystal habit: Tabular to platy octagonal crystals, tiny crystals, elongate
- Luster: Vitreous, greasy
- Diaphaneity: Translucent
- Specific gravity: 2.9
- Optical properties: Biaxial (-)
- Refractive index: n_{α} = 1.3239, n_{β} = 1.3245, n_{γ} = 1.3247
- Birefringence: δ = 0.001
- 2V angle: 75°(meas), 58° (calc)
- Other characteristics: Bitter taste

Avogadrite ((K,Cs)BF_{4}) is a potassium-caesium tetrafluoroborate in the halide class. Avogadrite crystallizes in the orthorhombic system (space group Pnma) with cell parameters a 8.66 Å, b 5.48 Å and c Å 7.03.

== History ==
The mineral was discovered by the Italian mineralogist Ferruccio Zambonini in 1926. He analyzed several samples from the volcanic fumaroles close to Mount Vesuvius and from the Lipari islands. In nature, it can only be found as a sublimation product around volcanic fumaroles. He named it after the Italian scientist Amedeo Avogadro (1776–1856).

== Bibliography ==
- Palache, P.; Berman H.; Frondel, C. (1960). "Dana's System of Mineralogy, Volume II: Halides, Nitrates, Borates, Carbonates, Sulfates, Phosphates, Arsenates, Tungstates, Molybdates, Etc. (Seventh Edition)" John Wiley and Sons, Inc., New York, pp. 97-98.
