= Acuminite =

Rare halide mineral

General
- Category: Halide mineral
- Formula: SrAlF_{4}OH·(H_{2}O)
- IMA symbol: Acu
- Strunz classification: 3.CC.10
- Crystal system: Monoclinic
- Crystal class: Prismatic (2/m) (same H-M symbol)
- Space group: C2/c
- Unit cell: a = 13.223, b = 5.175 c = 14.251 [Å]; β = 11.61°; Z = 8

Identification
- Color: White
- Crystal habit: Clusters of acute dipyramidal Spearhead shaped crystals
- Twinning: Contact on {100}
- Cleavage: Perfect on {001}
- Mohs scale hardness: 3.5
- Luster: Vitreous
- Diaphaneity: Transparent
- Specific gravity: 3.295
- Optical properties: Biaxial (+)
- Refractive index: n_{α} = 1.451 n_{β} = 1.453 n_{γ} = 1.462 - 1.463

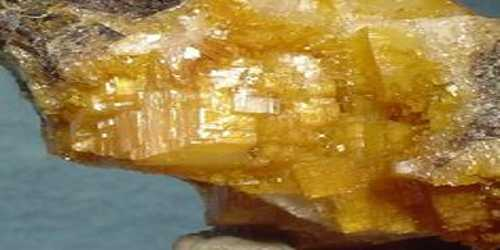
Acuminite

Acuminite is a rare halide mineral with chemical formula: SrAlF_{4}(OH)·(H_{2}O). Its name comes from the Latin word acumen, meaning "spear point". Its Mohs scale rating is 3.5.

Acuminite has only been described from its type locality of the cryolite deposit in Ivigtut, Greenland.

== See also ==
- List of minerals
