= Antarcticite =

Halide mineral

General
- Category: Halide mineral
- Formula: CaCl_{2}·6H_{2}O
- IMA symbol: Atc
- Strunz classification: 3.BB.30
- Crystal system: Trigonal
- Crystal class: Trapezohedral (32); H-M symbol: (32)
- Space group: P321
- Unit cell: a = 7.9, c = 3.95 [Å]; Z = 1

Identification
- Color: Colorless
- Crystal habit: Occurs as groups of acicular crystals
- Cleavage: Perfect on {0001}, very good on {1010}
- Tenacity: Brittle
- Mohs scale hardness: 2–3
- Luster: Vitreous
- Diaphaneity: Transparent
- Specific gravity: 1.715
- Optical properties: Uniaxial (−)
- Refractive index: n_{ω} = 1.550 n_{ε} = 1.490–1.500
- Birefringence: δ = 0.060
- Other characteristics: Deliquescent

Antarcticite is an uncommon calcium chloride hexahydrate mineral with formula CaCl_{2}·6H_{2}O. It forms colorless acicular trigonal crystals. It is hygroscopic and has a low relative density of 1.715.

As its name implies, it was first described in 1965 for an occurrence in Antarctica where it occurs as crystalline precipitate from a highly saline brine in Don Juan Pond, in the west end of Wright Valley, Victoria Land. This discovery was made by Japanese geochemists Tetsuya Torii and Joyo Ossaka. It was also reported from brine in Bristol Dry Lake, California, and stratified brine within blue holes on North Andros Island in the Bahamas. It has also been noted within fluid inclusions within quartz in pegmatite bodies in the Bushveld complex of South Africa. It occurs in association with halite, gypsum and celestine in the California dry lake.

A similar mineral, sinjarite, the dihydrate of calcium chloride, crystallizes in the tetragonal system. Sinjarite is semitransparent, with pale pink color. Hydrophilite is a now discredited calcium chloride mineral that is considered to be either antarcticite or sinjarite.

== See also ==
- Geology of Sinjar Mountains, for sinjarite
