= Chiolite =

Dipyramidal mineral

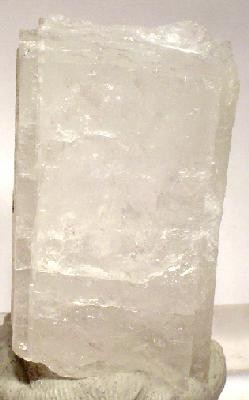

General
- Category: Halide minerals
- Formula: Na_{5}Al_{3}F_{14}
- IMA symbol: Cio
- Strunz classification: 03.CE.05
- Dana classification: 11.06.11.01
- Crystal system: Tetragonal
- Crystal class: Ditetragonal Dipyramidal - 4/mmm (4/m 2/m 2/m)
- Space group: P4/mnc
- Unit cell: 511.06 Å³

Identification
- Formula mass: 461.8711070
- Color: Nearly colorless, snow white
- Twinning: On {011}
- Cleavage: Perfect on {001} Distinct on {011}
- Mohs scale hardness: 2.5
- Luster: Vitreous, pearly, greasy
- Streak: White
- Diaphaneity: Transparent, translucent
- Specific gravity: 2.998
- Density: Measured: 2.998; Calculated: 2.989
- Optical properties: Uniaxial (-)
- Refractive index: n_{ω} = 1.349 n_{ε} = 1.342
- Birefringence: 0.007

Chiolite is a tetragonal-ditetragonal dipyramidal mineral, composed of sodium, fluorine, and aluminium. The name originates from the combination of the Greek words for snow (χιώυ) and stone (λίθος). It is an allusion to its similarity and appearance to cryolite (ice stone). Chiolite is an IMA approved mineral that has been grandfathered, meaning the name chiolite is believed to refer to a valid species to this day. Synonyms of chiolite are arksudite, arksutite, chodneffite, chodnewite and nipholith. It was first discovered in the Ilmen mountains, Russia, in 1846. Chiolite has been a valid species from the same year of its discovery.

== Properties ==
Chiolite consists of fluorine (57.59%), sodium (24.89%) and aluminium (17.53%). It does not show any radioactive properties whatsoever. Twinning sometimes distorts the crystals into a prismatic shape. In common literature, chiolite is usually referred to as having a 3.5 - 4 hardness on the mohs scale. However, chiolite is softer than cryolite is, which has a hardness of 2.5 - 3. Upon examining numerous samples, researchers determined chiolite to have a 2.5 hardness. When it is linked with topaz, brecciated chiolite transformed into cryolite among the fragments' rims according to a study. These transformations in thin sections appear to be solid state replacements. This transformation liberates both aluminium and potassium. With silica added, a reaction started with chiolite's breakdown, which formed topaz and potassium-mica.

== Occurrences and usage ==
It is a type locality in Russia, but otherwise it has occurrences in Greenland and Virginia. It occurs in granite pegmatites. At its type locality, chiolite is associated with cryolite, topaz, fluorite, thomsenolite, cryolithionite, phenakite, pachnolite and elpasolite. Due to its rarity, the difficulties of cutting the mineral and the lack of interest towards it, chiolite is rarely ever cut into a gem, hence why less than two dozens of cut specimens are estimated to exist. Cut stones that are clean always weigh 1-2 carats as bigger clean specimens suitable for cutting do not exist.
