= Terlinguaite =

Halide mineral

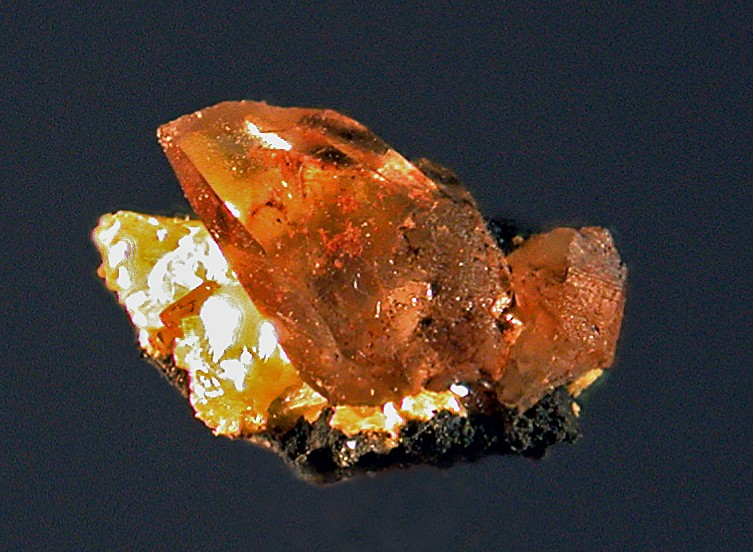
- Terlinguaite, collected from Mariposa Mine, Terlingua District, Brewster County, Texas, United States

General
- Category: Halide mineral
- Formula: Hg^{4+}_{3}Hg^{2+}Cl_{2}O_{2}
- IMA symbol: Tlg
- Strunz classification: 3.DD.20
- Crystal system: Monoclinic
- Crystal class: Prismatic (2/m) (same H-M symbol)
- Space group: C2/c
- Unit cell: a = 19.51 Å, b = 5.91 Å c = 9.47 Å; β = 143.81°; Z = 4

Identification
- Color: Sulfur-yellow, greenish yellow, brown
- Crystal habit: Aggregates of equant to elongated crystals, powdery, massive
- Cleavage: Perfect on [1̅01]
- Tenacity: Brittle
- Mohs scale hardness: 2.5
- Luster: Brilliant adamantine
- Streak: Lemon-yellow, turning olive-green
- Diaphaneity: Transparent to translucent
- Specific gravity: 9.22
- Optical properties: Biaxial (-)
- Refractive index: n_{α} = 2.350 n_{β} = 2.640 n_{γ} = 2.660
- Birefringence: δ = 0.310
- Pleochroism: Weak, green and yellow
- 2V angle: Measured: 20°
- Alters to: turns olive-green on exposure to light

Terlinguaite is the naturally occurring mineral with formula Hg^{4+}_{3}Hg^{2+}Cl_{2}O_{2}. It is formed by the weathering of other mercury-containing minerals. It was discovered in 1900 in the Terlingua District of Brewster County, Texas, for which it is named. Its color is yellow, greenish yellow, brown, or olive green.
