= Hibbingite =

Halide mineral

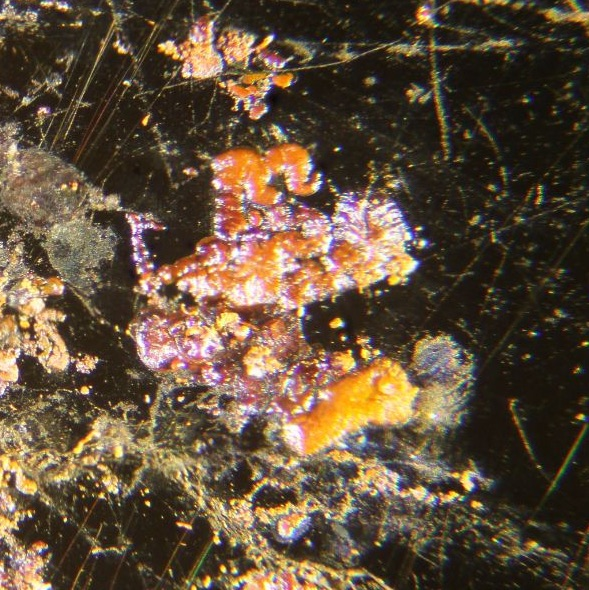

General
- Category: Halide mineral
- Formula: Fe_{2}(OH)_{3}Cl
- Strunz classification: 3.DA.10a 3 : HALIDES D : Oxyhalides, hydroxyhalides and related double halides A : With Cu, etc., without Pb
- Crystal system: Orthorhombic
- Crystal class: mmm (2/m 2/m 2/m) - Dipyramidal
- Space group: Pnam
- Unit cell: a=6.31(6), b=9.20( 4 ) ,c=7.10(7)L, v:412.17A', and Z=4

Identification
- Formula mass: 198.17
- Color: colorless to pale green, increasingly red with oxidation
- Crystal habit: platy
- Cleavage: perpendicular to vein walls
- Specific gravity: 3.04
- Density: 3.04 g/cm³
- Refractive index: 1.6-1.7
- Solubility: soluble in water and ethanol

Hibbingite is a divalent iron hydroxychloride found in the Duluth Complex of northeastern Minnesota, United States. Hibbingite can be found in troctolitic, partially serpentinized rocks. Hibbingite can also be found in sulfide ore from the Sudbury Complex, Canada, the Noril’sk Intrusion in Russia, and in terrestrially weathered meteorites. Hibbingite is mostly found as vein filings from drill cores taken from troctolitic, partially serpentinized rocks. Hibbingite itself can have cleavage perpendicular to the vein walls in which it is found. Hibbingite is associated with serpentine, olivine, plagioclase, biotite, and secondary magnetite or goethite. Fresh samples are internally green but turn reddish as they oxidize. Hibbingite is part of the atacamite family of minerals.

== Naming ==
Hibbingite is named after the town of Hibbing, Minnesota. Hibbingite is preserved at the drill core library of the Department of Natural Resources in Hibbing, Minnesota.

== Occurrence ==
Hibbingite occurs in the Duluth Complex of northeastern Minnesota. Specifically, it occurs in drill cores of serpentinized, troctolitic, or peridotitic rocks. Veins of hibbingite may crosscut olivine or plagioclase grains. Hibbingite can also occur along cleavage planes of biotite. It has also been identified from Norilsk, Siberia, Russia and together with a polymorph, parahibbingite, in Slovakia

== Physical and optical properties ==
Grain sizes of hibbingite range from 20 to 700 μm long and 3-100 μm wide. Hibbingite can be lens shaped, often in biotite. Hydration bubbles can form on the surface of the mineral after being exposed to atmospheric moisture. Hibbingite may exhibit feathery intergrowths of serpentine minerals. Hibbingite is colorless to pale green in its unoxidized form. The internal reflections of hibbingite are green but turn red as it oxidizes. Hibbingite is often lens shaped.

== Chemical Properties ==
Hibbingite is a divalent hydroxychloride. The simplified formula of hibbingite is Fe_{2}Cl(OH)_{3}. Hibbingite has the ability to oxidize. The internal reflections turn from green to red as it oxidizes. Hibbingite probably formed in the Duluth complex as a result of Cl rich fluids participating in serpentinization reactions. Hibbingite is a naturally occurring iron hydroxychloride. The iron in hibbingite is divalent. This was determined by measuring the FeLβ/Lα ratio of X-ray emission from hibbingite grains, and by visible-light absorption spectroscopy.

== Chemical composition ==
Element	wt%
Fe	56.36
Cl	17.89
OH	25.75
Total	100

== X-ray crystallography ==
X-ray diffraction analysis was originally carried out twice in an attempt to get the X-ray diffraction pattern of hibbingite. Neither attempt yielded unambiguous data. Hibbingite has an inferred space group of Pnam and a calculated density of 3.04 g/cm³. In 2019, a research group led by Natalia V. Zubkova solved the structure of hibbingite from X-ray diffraction. Their value was refined to R=2.07%.
