= Gagarinite-(Ce) =

Radioactive fluoride mineral

General
- Category: Halide mineral
- Formula: Na(REE_{x}Ca_{1−x})(REE_{y}Ca_{1−y})F_{6}
- IMA symbol: Gag-Ce
- Strunz classification: 03.AB.35
- Crystal system: Trigonal
- Crystal class: Rhombohedral (3̅); H-M symbol: (3̅)
- Space group: P3̅
- Unit cell: a = 6.099 Å, c = 11.064 Å, Z = 3

Identification
- Color: Colorless, pale pink, orange
- Crystal habit: Granular
- Cleavage: None
- Fracture: Conchoidal
- Tenacity: Brittle
- Mohs scale hardness: 3.5
- Luster: Vitreous
- Diaphaneity: Transparent
- Specific gravity: 4.44–4.55
- Optical properties: Uniaxial (+)
- Refractive index: n_{ω} = 1.483, n_{ε} = 1.503
- Birefringence: δ = 0.020

Gagarinite-(Ce) previously zajacite-(Ce) is a rare radioactive fluoride mineral with formula Na(REE_{x}Ca_{1−x})(REE_{y}Ca_{1−y})F_{6}. REE refers to rare-earth elements, mostly those belonging to the lanthanide series. It crystallizes in the trigonal rhombohedral system and has a white vitreous appearance with a conchoidal fracture. It has a Mohs hardness of 3.5 and a specific gravity of 4.44 to 4.55. Zajacite is transparent with refractive indices n_{ω} = 1.483 and n_{ε} = 1.503. Gagarinite-(Y) is a yttrium-rich analog.

It occurs as creamy to white anhedral to subhedral grains in pegmatite and aplite pods or lenses in a peralkaline igneous intrusion.

It was discovered in 1993 at Strange Lake, Quebec – Labrador, (56°20'N, 64°10'W) and was initially named for Ihor Stephan Zajac, who led the expedition responsible for its discovery, and who first recognized the presence of the new mineral. The mineral was renamed gagarinite-(Ce) in 2010 by the IMA. The new name is for Russian cosmonaut Yuri Gagarin (1934–1968).

== See also ==
- List of minerals
- List of minerals named after people
