= Tachyhydrite =

Deliquescent calcium and magnesium chloride mineral

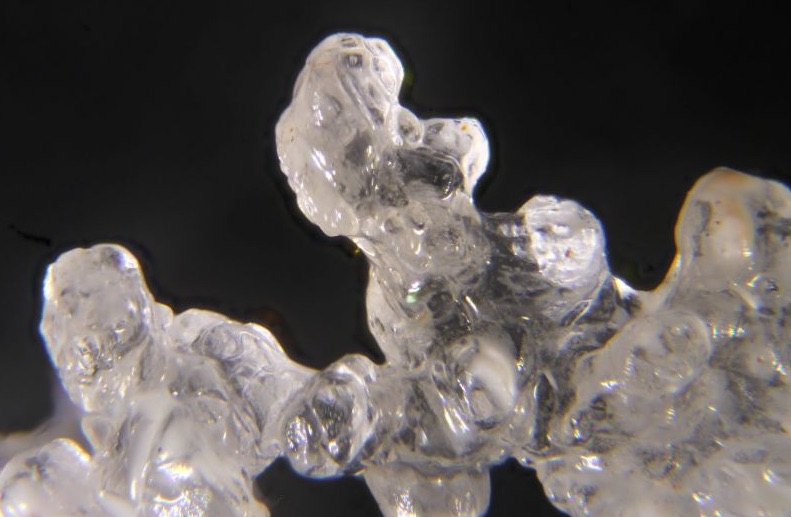

General
- Category: Halide minerals
- Formula: CaMg_{2}Cl_{6}·12H_{2}O
- IMA symbol: Thy
- Strunz classification: 3.BB.35
- Crystal system: Trigonal
- Crystal class: Rhombohedral 3̅; H-M symbol: 3̅
- Space group: R3̅

Identification
- Color: Colorless, light yellow
- Luster: vitreous
- Diaphaneity: transparent

Tachyhydrite is an unstable mineral, a hydrous chloride of calcium and magnesium with formula: CaMg_{2}Cl_{6}·12H_{2}O. It is a rare component of marine evaporite salt deposits. Upon exposure to moist air it rapidly deliquesces and dissolves.

It forms a colorless to yellow trigonal crystal with a vitreous luster. It is soft with a Mohs hardness of 2 and has a low specific gravity of 1.66. It has good cleavage in three directions and typically occurs in crystalline masses.

It was first described in 1856 for an occurrence in Stassfurt, Saxony, Germany. Its name is from the Greek for quick water, in reference to its ready deliquescence.

According to a patent filed years ago by a Halliburton researcher, high-strength hydrochloric acid treatment of magnesium-containing carbonates creates tachyhydrite, which will seal the rock pores and inhibit oil flow unless washed with a light acid or water before and after the treatment.
