= Marshite =

Isometric halide mineral

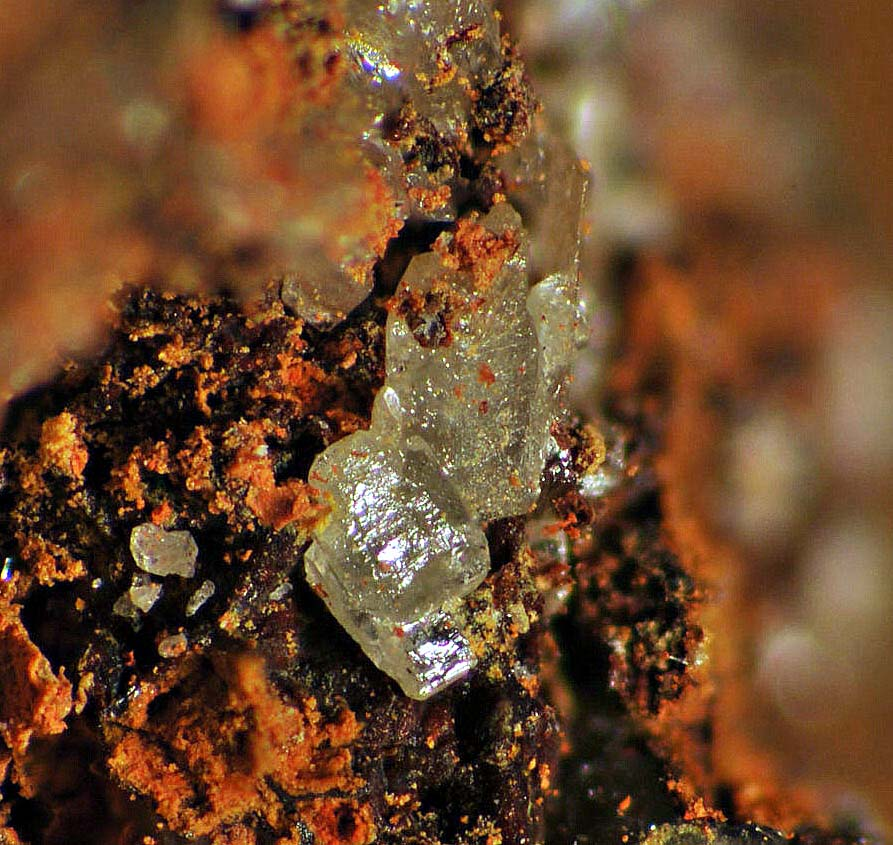
- Exceptionally well crystallized specimen of the rare copper iodide marshite from the Rubtsovskoe Deposit, Altaiskii Krai, Western Siberia, Russian Federation.

General
- Category: Halide mineral
- Formula: CuI
- IMA symbol: Msh
- Strunz classification: 3.AA.05
- Dana classification: 9.1.7.3
- Crystal system: Isometric
- Crystal class: Hextetrahedral (4̅3m)
- Space group: F4̅3m
- Unit cell: a = 6.05 Å (untwinned a = 6.6063(1) Å); Z=4

Identification
- Color: Honey-yellow, exposed to air pink-red to brick-red
- Crystal habit: Tetrahedral crystals, cubo-octahedral, crusts
- Twinning: On {111}
- Cleavage: {011} perfect
- Fracture: Conchoidal
- Tenacity: Brittle
- Mohs scale hardness: 2.5
- Luster: Adamantine, greasy
- Streak: Yellow
- Diaphaneity: Transparent
- Specific gravity: 5.68
- Density: 5.68 g/cm^{3} (measured), 5.71 g/cm^{3} (calculated)
- Optical properties: Isotropic
- Ultraviolet fluorescence: Dark red (SW, LW)

Marshite (CuI) is a naturally occurring isometric halide mineral with occasional silver (Ag) substitution for copper (Cu). Solid solution between the silver end-member miersite and the copper end-member marshite has been found in these minerals from deposits in Broken Hill, Australia. The mineral's name is derived from the person who first described it, an Australian mineral collector named Charles W. Marsh. Marsh drew attention to native copper iodide (Marshite) in the 1800s emphasizing its natural occurrence, it is not to be confused with copper (I) iodide a substance commonly synthesized in laboratory settings.

One of marshite's distinguishing features is that prior to exposure to air the mineral is a faint honey-yellow color, once exposed to the air however it becomes a brick-red color. Another characteristic useful in identifying marshite is the dark red color it fluoresces under short-wave (SW) and long-wave (LW) ultraviolet light.

== Geologic occurrence ==
The type locality of marshite is a metamorphosed Lead-Zinc-Silver ore deposit at Broken Hill, Yancowinna County, New South Wales, Australia. Some of marshite's common mineral associations at this locality include wad, limonite, native copper, cuprite, and cerussite.

Marshite occurs naturally in geologic supergene deposits at Chuquicamata, Chile which are heavily mined for copper. Additional research on the rocks and minerals from this area show that iodine isotopes found in minerals, such as marshite, and soils can be used to understand the processes that formed the supergene deposit.

In addition to multiple occurrences in Australia and Chile, marshite has been found and reported in Finland, Germany, Russia, and South Africa. At the Rubtsovsky locality in Altai Krai, Russia marshite is found associated with other iodine-rich halide minerals such as miersite in a base metal deposit. Marshite is found in the silver deposit mined at the Albert Silver Mine in Mpumalanga, South Africa associated with various silver-rich minerals.

== Bibliography ==
- Palache, P.; Berman H.; Frondel, C. (1960). "Dana's System of Mineralogy, Volume II: Halides, Nitrates, Borates, Carbonates, Sulfates, Phosphates, Arsenates, Tungstates, Molybdates, Etc. (Seventh Edition)" John Wiley and Sons, Inc., New York, pp. 20–22.
