= Calumetite =

Mineral

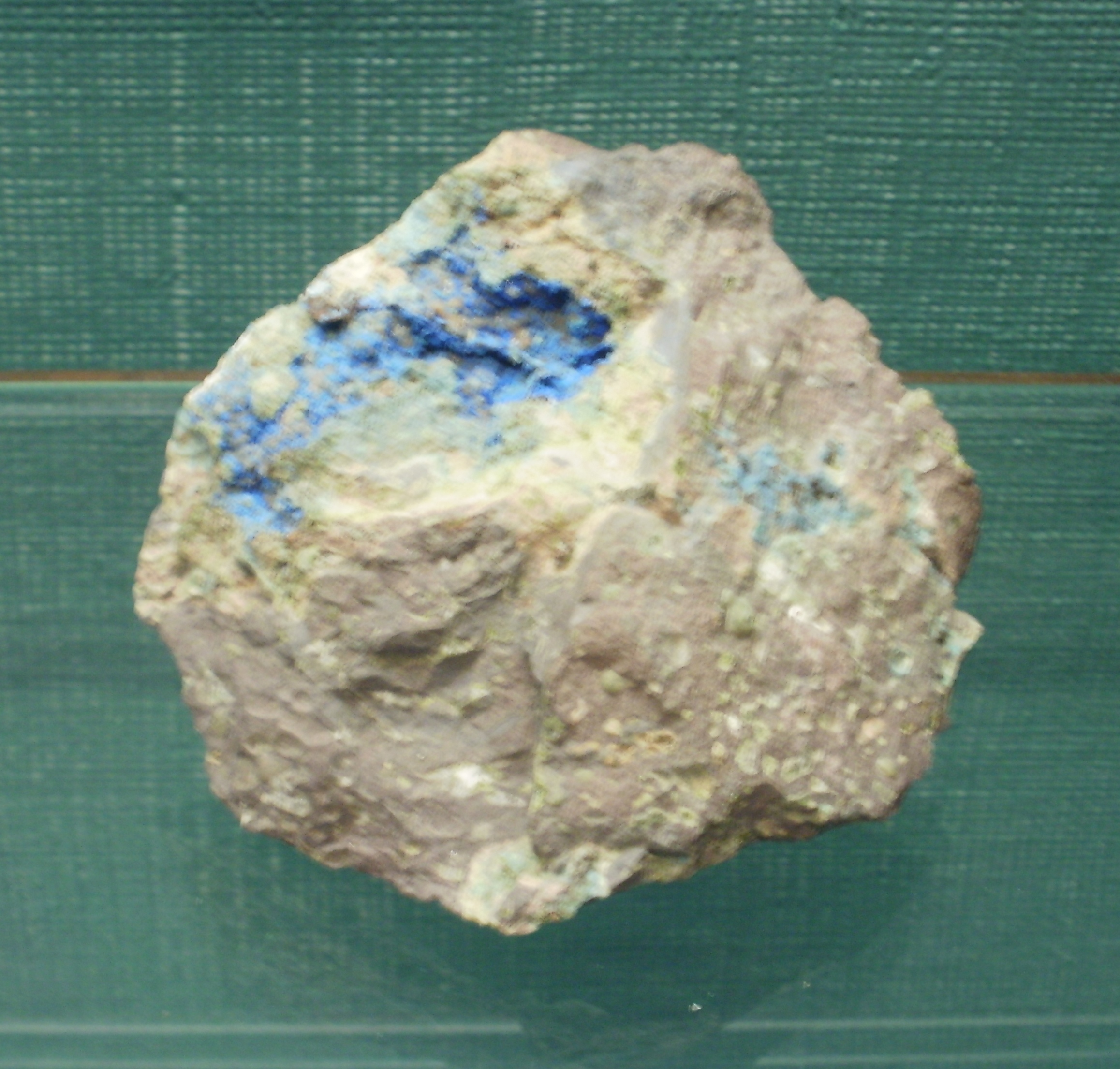
- Calumetite from the Akmeek No. 2 Mine in Keweenaw County, Michigan

General
- Category: Halide minerals
- Formula: Cu(OH,Cl)_{2}•2(H_{2}O)
- IMA symbol: Clu
- Strunz classification: 3.DA.40
- Crystal system: Orthorhombic; Unknown space group

Identification
- Mohs scale hardness: 2

Calumetite is a natural rarely occurring mineral. It was discovered in 1963 at the Centennial Mine near Calumet, Michigan, United States. Calumetite was first discovered along with anthonyite. It has a chemical formula of Cu(OH,Cl)_{2}•2(H_{2}O).

== History ==
Calumetite was discovered in 1963 at the Centennial Mine. It is named after the locality where it was found. The Centennial Mine is in Houghton County in Calumet, Michigan. The Centennial Mine has produced other copper minerals. Calumetite has been found to occur in basalt cavities; as painting in canvas and frescos; and also as corrosive products on bronze items. It is found in association with tremolite, quartz, epidote, monazite, copper, cuprite, atacamite, buttgenbachite, malachite, paratacamite, and anthonyite. Calumet, the locality where calumetite was found was once considered a mining industry. The Centennial Mine produced approximately 37 million pounds of refined copper before it was closed down in 1966 and overtaken.

== Physical properties ==
Calumetite occurs as a brilliant azure to powder blue mineral. It has a hardness of 2 with good cleavage along the {001} direction and belongs to the orthorhombic crystal system.

Calumetite has a bluish-white streak. Its luster is pearly on cleavage. Calumetite has a brittle tenacity and is semitransparent.

The specific gravity of calumetite could not be measured because of the difficulty in separating the quartz and epidote from the calumetite mineral coating them.

== Geologic occurrence ==
Calumetite was discovered with Anthonyite in 1963. Other copper minerals have been linked to calumetite which include copper, cuprite, malachite, atacamite, paratacamite, buttgenbachite. The minerals were found in the centennial mine which is known to yield copper minerals. Calumetite has been found in basalt cavities. Calumetite has been stated to be a naturally occurring mineral. It was prepared with ammonium chloride by means of the lime blue recipe which showed that the mineral is synthetic. Calumetite was first discovered in calumet Michigan but has since been observed in other mines near the Calumet mine. It was suggested that calumetite is not a post-mine evaporate because of the mode of occurrence . Calumetite is insoluble in ammonia and water, and soluble in cold dilute acids.

== Chemical properties and uses ==
Calumetite has been noted to be useful in paintings on canvas and fresco.
