= Aluminium fluoride =

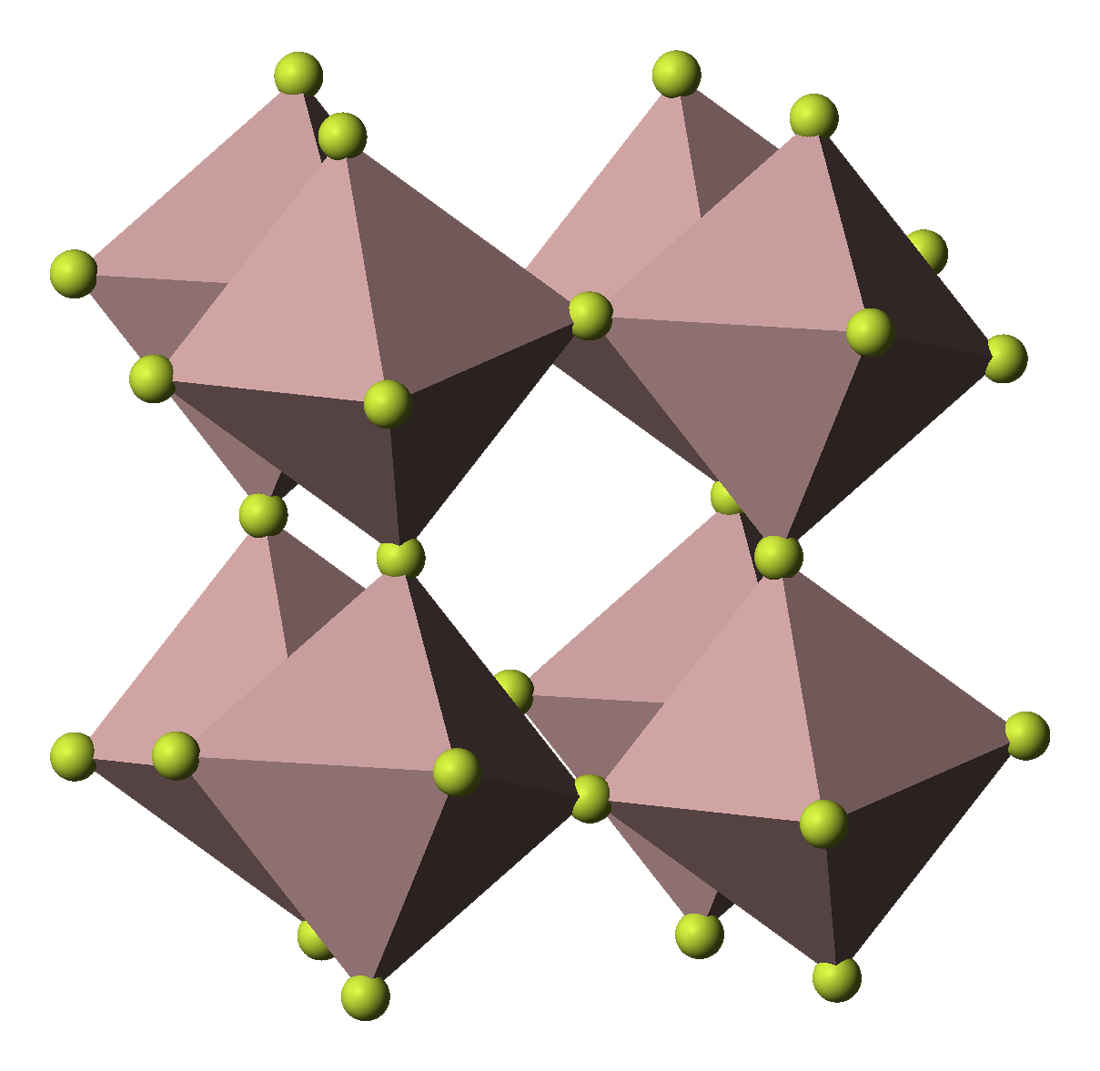
- Anhydrous AlF_{3}

Names
- Other names Aluminium(III) fluoride Aluminum trifluoride

Identifiers
CAS Number	7784-18-1; 32287-65-3 (monohydrate); 15098-87-0 (trihydrate)
3D model (JSmol)	monomer: Interactive image; crystal form: Interactive image
ChEBI	CHEBI:49464
ChemSpider	2039
ECHA InfoCard	100.029.137
PubChem CID	2124
RTECS number	BD0725000
UNII	Z77H3IKW94
CompTox Dashboard (EPA)	DTXSID8030712
- InChI: InChI=1S/Al.3FH/h;3*1H/q+3;;;/p-3 Key: KLZUFWVZNOTSEM-UHFFFAOYSA-K; InChI=1/Al.3FH/h;3*1H/q+3;;;/p-3 Key: KLZUFWVZNOTSEM-DFZHHIFOAC
- SMILES: monomer: F[Al](F)F; crystal form: F[Al](F[Al]0(F)(F)(F)F)(F[Al]1(F)(F)(F)F)(F[Al]2(F)(F)(F)F)(F[Al]3(F)(F)(F)F)F[Al](F[Al](F[Al]4(F)(F)(F)F)(F[Al]5(F)(F)(F)F)(F[Al]6(F)(F)(F)F)(F0)F)(F[Al](F[Al]7(F)(F)(F)F)(F[Al]8(F)(F)(F)F)(F1)(F4)F)(F[Al](F[Al]9(F)(F)(F)F)(F[Al]0(F)(F)(F)F)(F5)(F7)F)(F[Al](F[Al]1(F)(F)(F)F)(F2)(F8)(F9)F)F[Al](F3)(F6)(F0)(F1)F

Properties
Chemical formula	AlF_{3}
Molar mass	83.977 g/mol (anhydrous); 101.992 g/mol (monohydrate); 138.023 (trihydrate)
Appearance	Colorless to white crystalline solid
Odor	Odorless
Density	3.10 g/cm^{3} (anhydrous); 2.17 g/cm^{3} (monohydrate); 1.914 g/cm^{3} (trihydrate)
Melting point	1,290 °C (2,350 °F; 1,560 K) (anhydrous) (sublimes)
Solubility in water	5.6 g/L (0 °C); 6.7 g/L (20 °C); 17.2 g/L (100 °C)
Magnetic susceptibility (χ)	−13.4×10^{−6} cm^{3}/mol
Refractive index (n_{D})	1.3767 (visible range)

Structure
Crystal structure	Rhombohedral, hR24
Space group	R3̅c, No. 167
Lattice constant	a = 0.49254 nm, c = 1.24477 nm
Lattice volume (V)	0.261519
Formula units (Z)	6

Thermochemistry
Heat capacity (C)	75.1 J/(mol·K)
Std molar entropy (S^{⦵}_{298})	66.5 J/(mol·K)
Std enthalpy of formation (Δ_{f}H^{⦵}_{298})	−1510.4 kJ/mol
Gibbs free energy (Δ_{f}G^{⦵})	−1431.1 kJ/mol

Hazards
- GHS labelling
Pictograms	
Signal word	Danger
Hazard statements	H301, H302, H314, H315, H319, H335, H361, H372
Precautionary statements	P260, P264, P270, P271, P280, P301+P310, P301+P312, P301+P330+P331, P302+P352, P303+P361+P353, P304+P340, P305+P351+P338, P310, P312, P321, P330, P332+P313, P337+P313, P362, P363, P403+P233, P405, P501
NFPA 704 (fire diamond)	3 0 0
- NIOSH (US health exposure limits)
PEL (Permissible)	none
REL (Recommended)	2 mg/m^{3}
IDLH (Immediate danger)	N.D.
Safety data sheet (SDS)	InChem MSDS

Related compounds
Other anions	Aluminium chloride; Aluminium bromide; Aluminium iodide
Other cations	Boron trifluoride; Gallium trifluoride; Indium trifluoride; Thallium trifluoride
Related compounds	Scandium(III) fluoride; Yttrium(III) fluoride; Lutetium(III) fluoride; Lanthanum(III) fluoride; Cerium(III) fluoride; Actinium(III) fluoride
- Except where otherwise noted, data are given for materials in their standard state (at 25 °C [77 °F], 100 kPa). verify (what is ?) Infobox references

Aluminium fluoride is an inorganic compound with the formula AlF_{3}. It forms hydrates AlF_{3}·xH_{2}O. Anhydrous AlF_{3} and its hydrates are all colorless solids. Anhydrous AlF_{3} is used in the production of aluminium. Several occur as minerals.

== Occurrence and production ==
Aside from anhydrous AlF_{3}, several hydrates are known. With the formula AlF_{3}·xH_{2}O, these compounds include monohydrate (x = 1), two polymorphs of the trihydrate (x = 3), a hexahydrate (x = 6), and a nonahydrate (x = 9).

The majority of aluminium fluoride is produced by treating alumina with hydrogen fluoride at 700 °C: Hexafluorosilicic acid may also be used make aluminium fluoride.

H_{2}[SiF_{6}] + Al_{2}O_{3} + 3 H_{2}O → 2 AlF_{3} + SiO_{2} + 4 H_{2}O

Alternatively, it is manufactured by thermal decomposition of ammonium hexafluoroaluminate. For small scale laboratory preparations, AlF_{3} can also be prepared by treating aluminium hydroxide or aluminium with hydrogen fluoride.

Aluminium fluoride trihydrate is found in nature as the rare mineral rosenbergite.

The anhydrous form appears as the relatively recently (as of 2020) recognized mineral óskarssonite. A related, exceedingly rare mineral, is zharchikhite, AlF(OH)_{2}.

== Structure ==
According to X-ray crystallography, anhydrous AlF_{3} adopts the rhenium trioxide motif, featuring distorted AlF_{6} octahedra. Each fluoride is connected to two Al centers. Because of its three-dimensional polymeric structure, AlF_{3} has a high melting point. The other trihalides of aluminium in the solid state differ, AlCl_{3} has a layer structure and AlBr_{3} and AlI_{3}, are molecular dimers. Also they have low melting points and evaporate readily to give dimers. In the gas phase aluminium fluoride exists as trigonal molecules of D_{3h} symmetry. The Al–F bond lengths of this gaseous molecule are 163 pm.

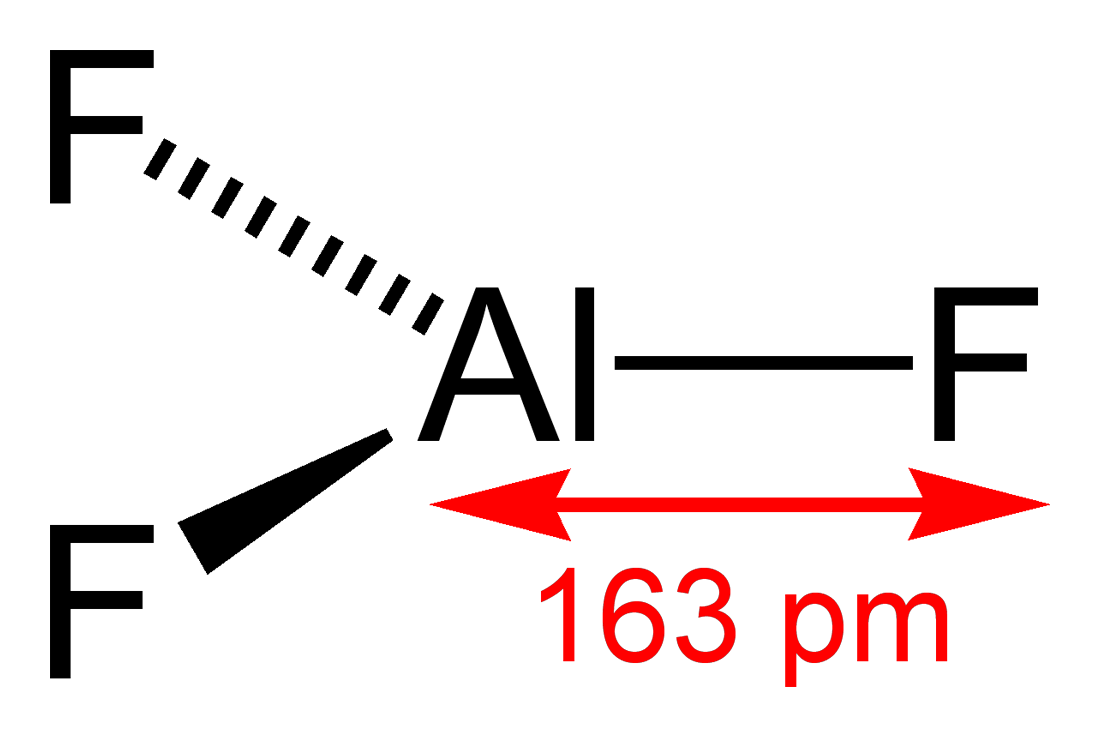
Like most gaseous metal trifluorides, AlF_{3} adopts a planar structure upon evaporation.

== Applications ==
Aluminium fluoride is an important additive for the production of aluminium by electrolysis. Together with cryolite, it lowers the melting point to below 1000 °C and increases the conductivity of the solution. It is into this molten salt that aluminium oxide is dissolved and then electrolyzed to give bulk Al metal.

Aluminium fluoride complexes are used to study the mechanistic aspects of phosphoryl transfer reactions in biology, which are of fundamental importance to cells, as phosphoric acid anhydrides such as adenosine triphosphate and guanosine triphosphate control most of the reactions involved in metabolism, growth and differentiation. The observation that aluminium fluoride can bind to and activate heterotrimeric G proteins has proven to be useful for the study of G protein activation in vivo, for the elucidation of three-dimensional structures of several GTPases, and for understanding the biochemical mechanism of GTP hydrolysis, including the role of GTPase-activating proteins.

=== Niche uses ===
Together with zirconium fluoride, aluminium fluoride is an ingredient for the production of fluoroaluminate glasses.

It is also used to inhibit fermentation.

Like magnesium fluoride it is used as a low-index optical thin film, particularly when far UV transparency is required. Its deposition by physical vapor deposition, particularly by evaporation, is favorable.

== Safety ==
The reported oral animal lethal dose (LD_{50}) of aluminium fluoride is 100 mg/kg. Repeated or prolonged inhalation exposure may cause asthma, and may have effects on the bone and nervous system, resulting in bone alterations (fluorosis), and nervous system impairment.

Many of the neurotoxic effects of fluoride are due to the formation of aluminium fluoride complexes, which mimic the chemical structure of a phosphate and influence the activity of ATP phosphohydrolases and phospholipase D. Only micromolar concentrations of aluminium are needed to form aluminium fluoride.

Human exposure to aluminium fluoride can occur in an industrial setting, such as emissions from aluminium reduction processes, or when a person ingests both a fluoride source (e.g., fluoride in drinking water or residue of fluoride-based pesticides) and an aluminium source; sources of human exposure to aluminium include drinking water, tea, food residues, infant formula, aluminium-containing antacids or medications, deodorants, cosmetics, and glassware. Fluoridation chemicals may also contain aluminium fluoride. Data on the potential neurotoxic effects of chronic exposure to the aluminium species existing in water are limited.

== See also ==
- Aluminium monofluoride
