= Anthonyite =

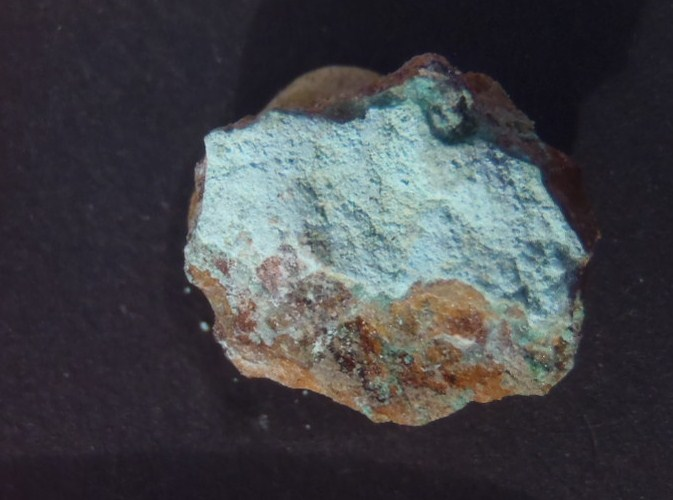
- Anthonyite from Mexico

General
- Category: Halide mineral
- Formula: Cu(OH,Cl)_{2}·3(H_{2}O)
- IMA symbol: Aty
- Strunz classification: 3.DA.40
- Crystal system: Monoclinic; Space group unknown
- Crystal class: Prismatic (2/m) (same H-M symbol)

Identification
- Color: Lavender
- Crystal habit: Prismatic crystals, commonly curved along [001]; as incrustations
- Cleavage: {100}, good
- Tenacity: Sectile
- Mohs scale hardness: 2
- Diaphaneity: Translucent
- Optical properties: Biaxial (−)
- Refractive index: nα = 1.526 nβ = 1.602 nγ = 1.602
- Birefringence: δ = 0.076
- Pleochroism: X = rich lavender; Y = Z = deep smoky blue
- 2V angle: Measured: 3°

Anthonyite is a hydrous secondary copper halide mineral with chemical formula of Cu(OH,Cl)_{2}·3(H_{2}O).

It was discovered in 1963 in the Centennial mine, Calumet, Houghton County, Michigan, United States. It was discovered by the University of Arizona mineralogist John W. Anthony (1920–1992), who named it for himself.

Anthonyite is lavender in color, has a Mohs hardness of 2 and crystallizes in the monoclinic crystal system.

Anthonyite occurs as an alteration of native copper in basalt in fractures and cavities by circulation of chloride rich groundwater or connate fluids. The similar orthorhombic mineral calumetite occurs by the same process. It occurs associated with tremolite, quartz, epidote, monazite, native copper, cuprite and paratacamite in the Centennial mine area. It also occurs in the Cole mine, at Bisbee, Cochise County, Arizona; and Villa Hermosa, Sonora, Mexico. It occurs as a slag mineral in Richelsdorf, Hesse, Germany and Laurium, Greece.
