= Mercury polycations =

Cations solely of mercury

Structural details of [Hg_{4}]^{2+} in [Hg_{4}][AsF_{6}]_{2}. Distances in picometers.

Mercury polycations are polyatomic cations that contain only mercury atoms. The best known example is the Hg^{2+}_{2} ion, found in mercury(I) (mercurous) compounds. The existence of the metal–metal bond in Hg(I) compounds was established using X-ray studies in 1927 and Raman spectroscopy in 1934 making it one of the earliest, if not the first, metal–metal covalent bonds to be characterised.

Other mercury polycations are the linear Hg^{2+}_{3} and Hg^{2+}_{4} ions, and the triangular Hg^{4+}_{3} ion and a number of chain and layer polycations.

== Mercury(I) ==
The best known polycation of mercury is Hg^{2+}_{2}, in which mercury has a formal oxidation state of +1. The Hg^{2+}_{2} ion was perhaps the first metal–metal bonded species confirmed. The presence of the Hg^{2+}_{2} ion in solution was shown by Ogg in 1898. In 1900, Baker showed the presence of HgCl dimers in the vapour phase. The presence of Hg^{2+}_{2} units in the solid state was first determined in 1926 using X-ray diffraction. The presence of the metal-metal bond in solution was confirmed using Raman spectroscopy in 1934.

Hg^{2+}_{2} is stable in aqueous solution, where it is in equilibrium with Hg^{2+} and elemental Hg, with Hg^{2+} present at around 0.6%. Anions of insoluble salts readily shift the equilibrium: S^{2−}, which forms an insoluble Hg(II) salt, induces complete disproportionation, whereas Cl^{−}, which forms an insoluble Hg(I) salt, induces the reverse. Most salts with main group elements tend to contain only Hg(II) and metallic mercury, because the presence of strong Lewis bases destabilizes the intermetallic bond. In appropriate solvents, however, Hg(I) salts with derivatives of amides, pyridines, phosphorus trifluoride, tin(II), and certain other main group elements are all known.

Minerals that are known that contain the Hg^{2+}_{2} cation include eglestonite.

== Linear trimercury and tetramercury cations ==
Compounds containing the linear Hg^{2+}_{3} (in which mercury has the formal oxidation state 2/3) and Hg^{2+}_{4} (in which mercury has the formal oxidation state 1/2) cations have been synthesised. These ions are only known in the solid state in compounds such as Hg_{3}[AlCl_{4}]_{2} and Hg_{4}[AsF_{6}]_{2}. The Hg–Hg bond length is 255 pm in Hg^{2+}_{3}, and 255–262 pm in Hg^{2+}_{4}. The bonding involves 2-centre-2-electron bonds formed by 6s orbitals.

== Cyclic mercury cations ==
The triangular Hg^{4+}_{3} cation was confirmed in a reinvestigation of the mineral terlinguaite in 1989 and subsequently synthesised in a number of compounds. The bonding has been described in terms of a three-center two-electron bond where overlap of the 6s orbitals on the mercury atoms gives (in D_{3h} symmetry) a bonding "a_{1}" orbital.

== Chain and layer polycations ==
The golden yellow compound Hg_{2.86}(AsF_{6}), named "alchemists' gold" by its discoverers, contains perpendicular chains of Hg atoms.

The "metallic" compounds Hg_{3}NbF_{6} and Hg_{3}TaF_{6} contain hexagonal layers of mercury atoms separated by layers of MF^{−}_{6} anions. They are both superconductors below 7 K.
