= Chlorocalcite =

General
- Category: Halide mineral
- Formula: KCaCl_{3}
- IMA symbol: Ccal
- Strunz classification: 3.AA.40
- Crystal system: Orthorhombic
- Crystal class: Dipyramidal (mmm); H-M symbol: (2/m 2/m 2/m)
- Space group: Pnma (from synthetic crystals)
- Unit cell: a = 7.35 Å, b = 10.44 Å, c = 7.25 Å; Z = 4

Identification
- Formula mass: 185.54 g/mol
- Color: White, tinged violet
- Crystal habit: Prismatic or tabular cube-like crystals, pseudo cubic
- Cleavage: Perfect on {001}, good on {010} and {100}
- Mohs scale hardness: 2.5-3
- Diaphaneity: Transparent to semi-transparent
- Density: 2.16 calculated
- Optical properties: Biaxial (–)
- Refractive index: ~1.52
- Birefringence: weak
- Solubility: In water
- Other characteristics: Deliquescent

Chlorocalcite is a rare potassium calcium chloride evaporite mineral with formula: KCaCl_{3}. It is found in active volcanic fumaroles.

It was first described in 1872 for an occurrence on Mount Vesuvius and given the name for its calcium content previous to discovering that it also contained potassium. It has also been reported from the Desdemona Mine, Peine, Lower Saxony, Germany.
