= Capgaronnite =

Halide-sulfide mineral

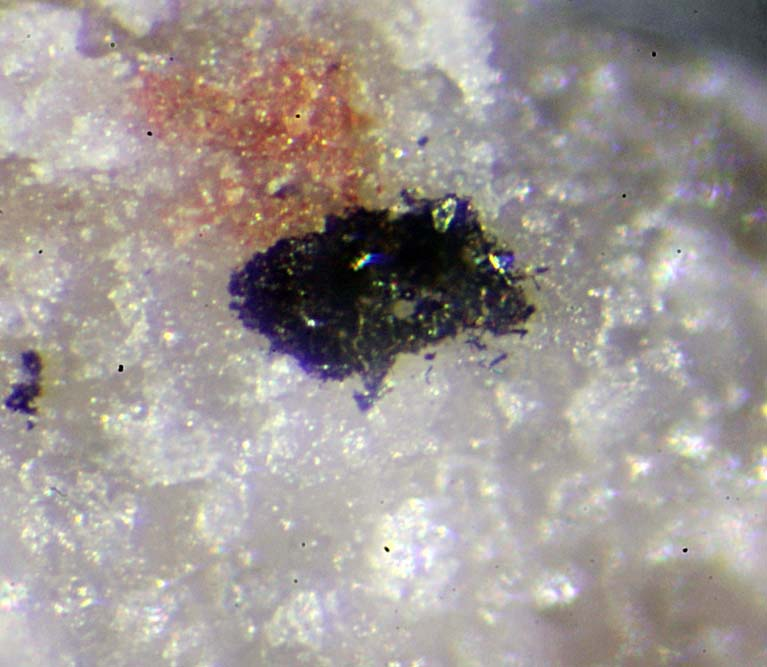
- A lot of small almost black microcrystals of the extremely rare capgaronnite in a white contrasting matrix.

General
- Category: Sulfide mineral Halide mineral
- Formula: HgS•Ag(Cl,Br,I)
- IMA symbol: Cga
- Strunz classification: 2.FC.20a
- Dana classification: 2.15.6.1
- Crystal system: Orthorhombic
- Space group: P222
- Unit cell: a = 6.8 Å; b = 12.87 Å; c = 4.52 Å; Z = 4

Identification
- Color: Black, gray, greenish, yellow
- Crystal habit: Prismatic
- Twinning: Contact twinning
- Cleavage: perfect {010}
- Fracture: Uneven
- Luster: Sub-Adamantine, Sub-Metallic
- Streak: Gray-black
- Diaphaneity: Translucent, Opaque
- Specific gravity: 6.19
- Refractive index: n_{α} = 2.200 n_{γ} = 2.300
- Pleochroism: thin splinters, α = dark brown and γ = gray to clear purple

Capgaronnite (HgS•Ag(Cl,Br,I)) is a mineral that forms small tufted aggregates or isolated crystals with a maximum width of 0.02mm and a maximum length of 0.1mm. This mineral is related to perroudite in chemical composition and crystal structure. Capgaronnite is associated with secondary minerals of Cu like olivenite, cyanotrichite, and tennantite.

== Occurrence ==
Capgaronnite is a rare mineral that was observed in the Cap-Garonne copper-lead mine of Var, France. Capgaronnite is found in cavities of Triassic Conglomerate (geology) and Sandstone. In Spain, capgaronnite has been found as microcrystals similar to those from the Cap-Garonne in the Cocotas mine, Tíjola, Almería province.

== Chemical properties ==
The Chemical composition of capgaronnite was determined by Electron probe microanalysis of capgaronnite. This analysis technique uses an electron beam to bombard a sample and recording the resultant x-rays for wavelengths know to each element. Chemical analysis of capgaronnite is very difficult, because of the volatility of the elements. Silver in particular is very mobile and capgaronnite crystals, on average, are very small. The formation of capgaronnite likely occurs as tennantite high in Ag and Hg is decomposed in the presence of a halide solution.

Table 1. Mean EPMA results for capgaronnite
	Mean
Hg	53.92
Ag	23.99
S	7.96
Cl	10.58
Br	5.17
I	0.33
Total	101.95

== Crystal properties ==
Layers of parallel, face-shared Hg octahedra that are stacked vertically around zigzagging chains of -S-Hg-S- bonds which are joined together by cross-linking Ag tetrahedra. The basic structure of capgaronnite are layers of Hg octahedra parallel to (010). The crystal structure was determined by precession X-ray diffraction and the Weissenberg method on a single crystal. With the data from the single crystal and powder x-ray diffractions Mason and others (1992) were able to use a 3-dimensional Patterson function to calculate the location for the Hg atom in the structure. The positions of other atoms within the structure were calculated using Difference density map and structure-factor recycling methods.

== Relationship to tocornalite ==
During analysis the X-ray diffraction data, it was discovered that capgaronnite and tocornalite, a mineral identified by Ignacy Domeyko and described as a silver-mercury iodide, were extremely similar. The x-ray diffraction data was collected through the use of Powder diffraction methods using a Gandolfi camera (114.6-mm diameter, Ni-filtered CuKα). The X-ray data used by the International Centre for Diffraction Data for tocornalite was obtained from a sample labeled as such in the National Museum of Natural History (France) from Chanarcilla, Chile and it may have not been obtained from a tocornalite cotype. Analysis of the Broken Hill, by use of EPMA at CSIRO, sample yields a chemical formula of Hg_{1.07}S_{1.09}•Ag_{0.87}(Cl_{0.88},Br_{0.09},I_{0.01}). This likely means that the Broken Hill and possibly the Chilean specimen are chemically different from Ignacy Domeyko's tocornalite. After an attempt to obtain the type specimen from the National Museum in Paris resulted in the discovery that the institution does not have a type specimen, it may be appropriate to consider tocornalite an inadequately described mineral.

== See also ==
- List of minerals
