= Cadwaladerite =

Aluminium halide mineral

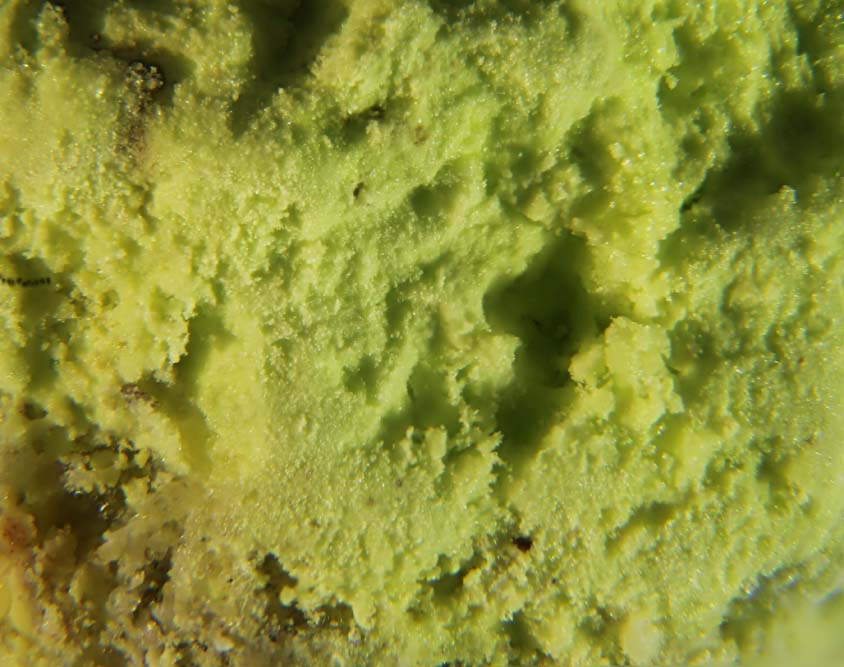
- Yellow microcrystals and masses of the very rare aluminium chloride-hydroxide mineral Cadwaladerite from only one the three known localities worldwide: Maria Mine, Caleta Vítor District, Arica & Parinacota Region, Chile.

General
- Category: Halide mineral
- Formula: AlCl(OH)_{2}·4H_{2}O
- IMA symbol: Cwd
- Strunz classification: 3.BD.05
- Crystal system: amorphous

Identification
- Formula mass: 168.51 g/mol
- Color: Lemon yellow
- Fracture: Conchoidal
- Luster: Vitreous
- Diaphaneity: transparent
- Specific gravity: 1.66
- Optical properties: Isotropic
- Refractive index: n = 1.513, variable
- Other characteristics: deliquescent

Cadwaladerite is a rare aluminium halide mineral with formula: AlCl(OH)_{2}·4(H_{2}O). It was reported for an amorphous substance associated with sulfate minerals and embedded in a halite crystal cluster. Its status is uncertain due to inadequate data. It was first described in 1941 for an occurrence in mine dumps of the Victoria Segunda mine Cerros Pintados, Iquique province, Tarapacá Region, Chile. It was named for Charles Meigs Biddle Cadwalader, president of the Academy of Natural Sciences. Lesukite was discredited (IMA2018-H).
