= Copper(I) iodide =

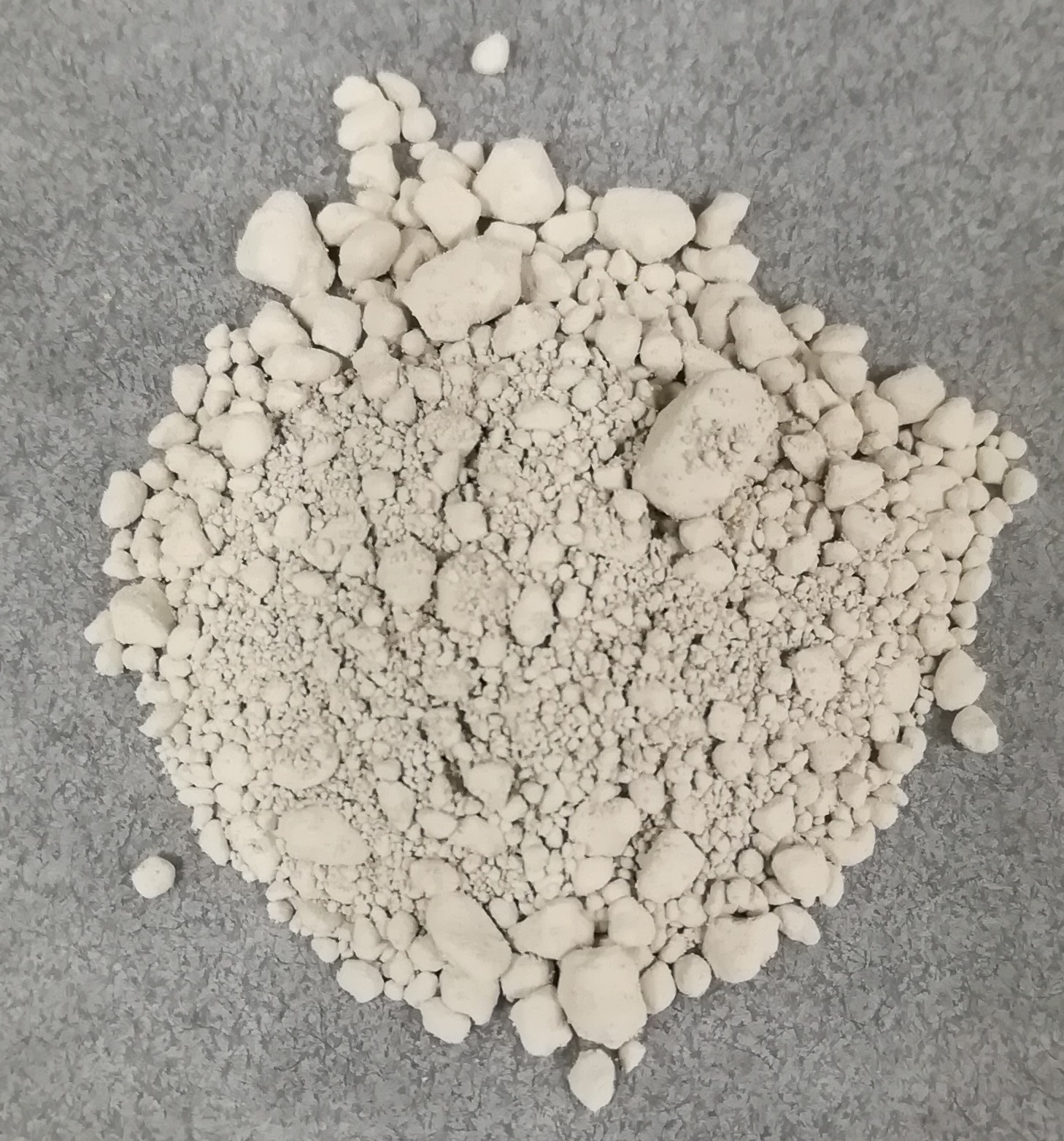
- Copper(I) iodide

Names
- IUPAC name Copper(I) iodide
- Other names Cuprous iodide, marshite

Identifiers
CAS Number	7681-65-4
3D model (JSmol)	Interactive image
ChemSpider	22766
ECHA InfoCard	100.028.795
PubChem CID	24350
UNII	7DE9CA6IL2
CompTox Dashboard (EPA)	DTXSID5041803
- InChI: InChI=1S/Cu.HI/h;1H/q+1;/p-1 Key: LSXDOTMGLUJQCM-UHFFFAOYSA-M; InChI=1/Cu.HI/h;1H/q+1;/p-1 Key: LSXDOTMGLUJQCM-REWHXWOFAV
- SMILES: [Cu]I

Properties
Chemical formula	CuI
Molar mass	190.450 g·mol^{−1}
Appearance	White solid
Odor	odorless
Density	5.67 g/cm^{3}
Melting point	606 °C (1,123 °F; 879 K)
Boiling point	1,290 °C (2,350 °F; 1,560 K) (decomposes)
Solubility in water	0.000042 g/100 mL
Solubility product (K_{sp})	1.27 × 10^{−12}
Solubility	soluble in ammonia and iodide solutions insoluble in dilute acids
Vapor pressure	10 mm Hg (656 °C)
Magnetic susceptibility (χ)	−63.0·10^{−6} cm^{3}/mol
Refractive index (n_{D})	2.346

Structure
Crystal structure	zincblende
Coordination geometry	Tetrahedral anions and cations

Hazards
- GHS labelling
Pictograms	(GHS05: Corrosive) (GHS07: Exclamation mark) (GHS09: Environmental hazard)
Signal word	Danger
Hazard statements	H302, H315, H319, H335, H410
Precautionary statements	P261, P273, P305+P351+P338, P501
NFPA 704 (fire diamond)	1 1 0
Flash point	Non-flammable
- NIOSH (US health exposure limits)
PEL (Permissible)	TWA 1 mg/m^{3} (as Cu)
REL (Recommended)	TWA 1 mg/m^{3} (as Cu)
IDLH (Immediate danger)	TWA 100 mg/m^{3} (as Cu)
Safety data sheet (SDS)	Sigma Aldrich

Related compounds
Other anions	Copper(I) fluoride; Copper(I) chloride; Copper(I) bromide
Other cations	Silver iodide; Gold monoiodide; Sodium iodide
- Except where otherwise noted, data are given for materials in their standard state (at 25 °C [77 °F], 100 kPa). verify (what is ?) Infobox references

Copper(I) iodide is an inorganic compound with the chemical formula CuI. It is also known as cuprous iodide. It is useful in a variety of applications ranging from organic synthesis to cloud seeding.

Copper(I) iodide is white, but samples often appear tan or, when found in nature as rare mineral marshite, reddish brown, but such color is due to the presence of impurities. It is common for samples of iodide-containing compounds to become discolored due to the facile aerobic oxidation of the iodide anion to molecular iodine.

== Structure ==
Copper(I) iodide, like most binary (containing only two elements) metal halides, is an inorganic polymer. It has a rich phase diagram, meaning that it exists in several crystalline forms. It adopts a zinc blende structure below 390 °C (γ-CuI), a wurtzite structure between 390 and 440 °C (β-CuI), and a rock salt structure above 440 °C (α-CuI). The ions are tetrahedrally coordinated when in the zinc blende or the wurtzite structure, with a Cu-I distance of 2.338 Å. Copper(I) bromide and copper(I) chloride also transform from the zinc blende structure to the wurtzite structure at 405 and 435 °C, respectively. Therefore, the longer the copper–halide bond length, the lower the temperature needs to be to change the structure from the zinc blende structure to the wurtzite structure. The interatomic distances in copper(I) bromide and copper(I) chloride are 2.173 and 2.051 Å, respectively. Consistent with its covalency, CuI is a p-type semiconductor.

γ-CuI	β-CuI	α-CuI

== Preparation ==
Copper(I) iodide can be prepared by heating iodine and copper in concentrated hydroiodic acid.

In the laboratory however, copper(I) iodide is prepared by simply mixing an aqueous solution of potassium iodide and a soluble copper(II) salt such as copper(II) sulfate.

2 Cu^{2+} + 4 I^{−} → 2 CuI + I_{2}

== Uses ==
In combination with 1,2- or 1,3-diamine ligands, CuI catalyzes the conversion of aryl, heteroaryl, and vinyl bromides into the corresponding iodides. NaI is the typical iodide source and dioxane is a typical solvent (see aromatic Finkelstein reaction).

CuI is used as a co-catalyst with palladium catalyst in the Sonogashira coupling.

CuI is used in cloud seeding, altering the amount or type of precipitation of a cloud, or their structure by dispersing substances into the atmosphere which increase water's ability to form droplets or crystals. CuI provides a sphere for moisture in the cloud to condense around, causing precipitation to increase and cloud density to decrease.

The structural properties of CuI allow CuI to stabilize heat in nylon in commercial and residential carpet industries, automotive engine accessories, and other markets where durability and weight are a factor.

CuI is used as a source of dietary iodine in table salt and animal feed.

== Reactions ==
Copper(I) iodide reacts with mercury vapors to form brown copper(I) tetraiodomercurate(II):

4 CuI + Hg → (Cu^{+})_{2}[HgI_{4}]^{2−} + 2 Cu

This reaction can be used for the detection of mercury since the white CuI to brown Cu_{2}[HgI_{4}] color change is dramatic.

Copper(I) iodide is used in the synthesis of Cu(I) clusters such as [Cu_{6}I_{7}]^{−}.

Copper(I) iodide dissolves in acetonitrile, yielding diverse complexes. Upon crystallization, molecular or polymeric compounds can be isolated. Dissolution is also observed when a solution of the appropriate complexing agent in acetone or chloroform is used. For example, thiourea and its derivatives can be used. Solids that crystallize out of those solutions are composed of hybrid inorganic chains.
