= Asisite =

Mineral

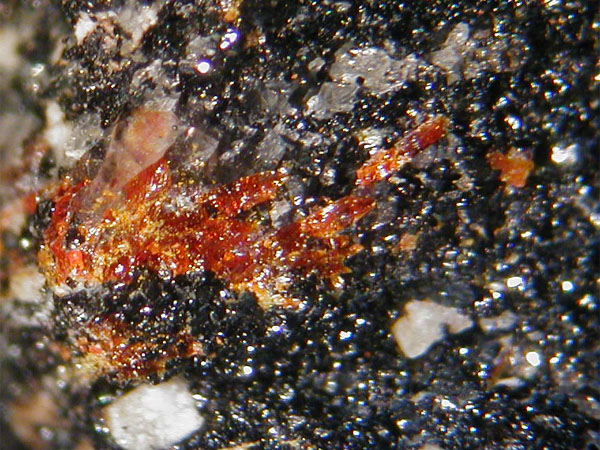
- Asisite from Kombat Mine, Namibia

General
- Category: Halide
- Formula: Pb_{7}SiO_{4}O_{4}Cl_{2}
- Strunz classification: 3.DB.40
- Crystal system: Tetragonal; Ditetragonal dipyramidal class
- Space group: Tetragonal; H-M symbol: (4/m 2/m 2/m); Space group: I4/mmm

Identification
- Colour: yellow to yellow-green, red
- Mohs scale hardness: 3 1/2

Asisite (Pb_{7}SiO_{8}Cl_{2}) is a yellow tetragonal mineral, found at the Kombat Mine, Kombat, Grootfontein District, Otjozondjupa Region, Namibia. It was named for a farm, Asis, where the mine where it was found, is located. It was discovered in 1988.
