= Artroeite =

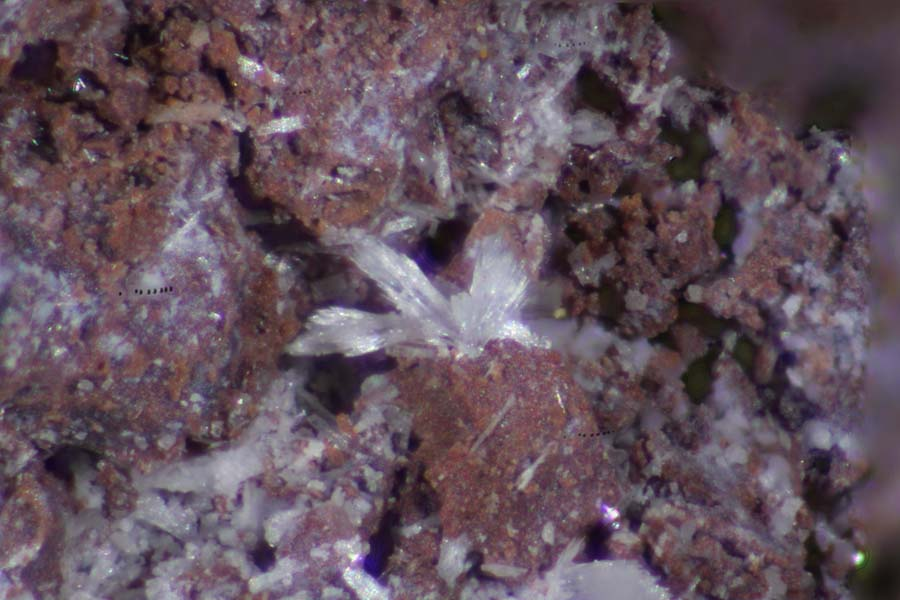
- Artroeite, from Monte Somma, Vesuvius, Campania, Italy

General
- Category: Halide
- Formula: PbAlF_{3}(OH)_{2}
- IMA symbol: Ate
- Strunz classification: 3.CC.15
- Crystal system: Triclinic
- Crystal class: Pinacoidal (1̅) (same H-M symbol)
- Space group: P1̅

Artroeite (PbAlF_{3}(OH)_{2}) is a mineral found in Arizona. It is named for the late American chemist Arthur Roe (1912–1993).
