= Kremersite =

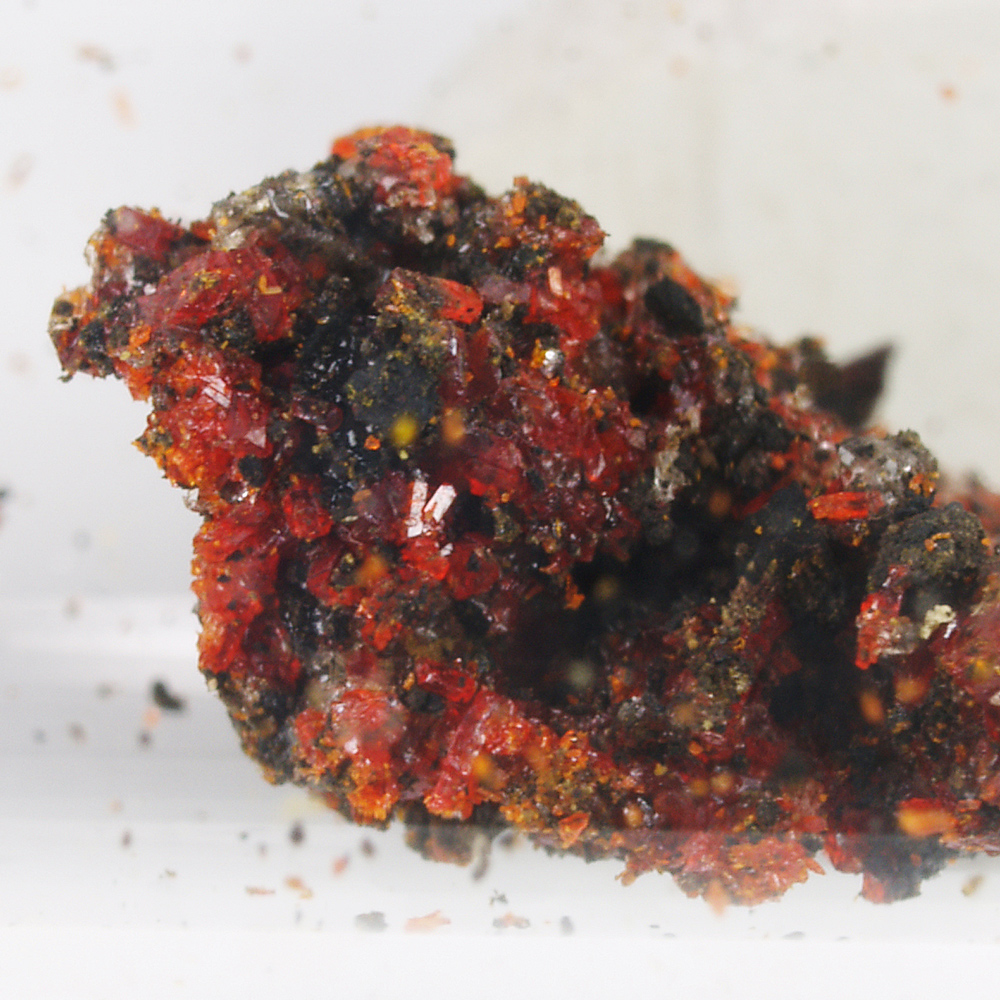
- Kremersite found in Russia

General
- Category: Minerals
- Formula: (NH_{4},K)_{2}FeCl_{5}·H_{2}O
- IMA symbol: Km

Identification
- Color: Ruby-red to red, brownish red
- Luster: Vitreous
- Diaphaneity: Translucent
- Specific gravity: 2.175

Kremersite is a rare mineral which is a hydrated multiple chloride of iron, ammonium and potassium with the formula: (NH_{4},K)_{2}FeCl_{5}·H_{2}O. Kremersite is a brown-red to orange mineral that crystallizes in the orthorhombic system. It is a water-soluble mineral that is found around volcanic fumaroles. Occurs at Vesuvius, Italy and Mount Etna, Sicily. It was discovered in 1853 and named for the German chemist, Peter Kremers (born 1827).
