= Thomsenolite =

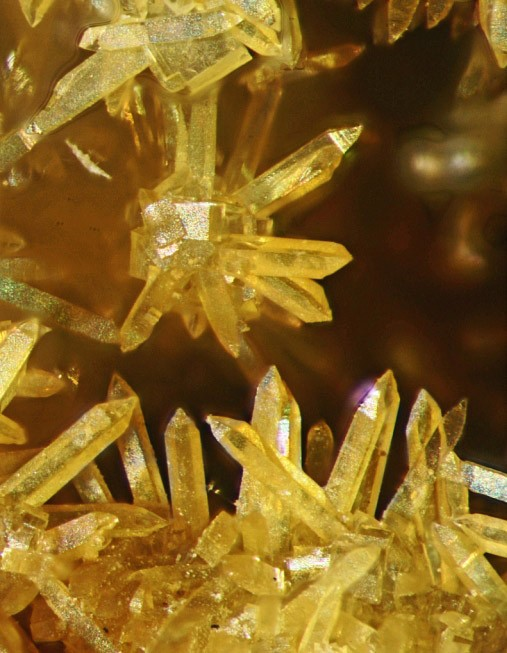
- Thomsenolite (obelisks) and some pseudocubic ralstonite (picture center)

General
- Category: Halide minerals
- Formula: NaCaAlF_{6}·H_{2}O
- IMA symbol: Tse
- Strunz classification: 3.CB.40
- Crystal system: Monoclinic
- Crystal class: Prismatic (2/m) (same H-M symbol)
- Space group: P2_{1}/b

Identification
- Color: Colourless, white, pale lilac; brownish or reddish tinted due to staining; colourless in transmitted light.
- Cleavage: Perfect; On {001}; {110} distinct.
- Fracture: Irregular/ uneven
- Tenacity: Brittle
- Mohs scale hardness: 2
- Lustre: Vitreous, pearly
- Streak: White
- Diaphaneity: Transparent, translucent
- Density: 2.981 g/cm^{3}

Thomsenolite is a mineral with formula: NaCaAlF_{6}·H_{2}O. It is an alteration product of cryolite.

It was discovered in 1868 in Ivigtut, Greenland and named for Hans Peter Jorgen Julius Thomsen (1826–1909).
