= Ammonium hexafluoroaluminate =

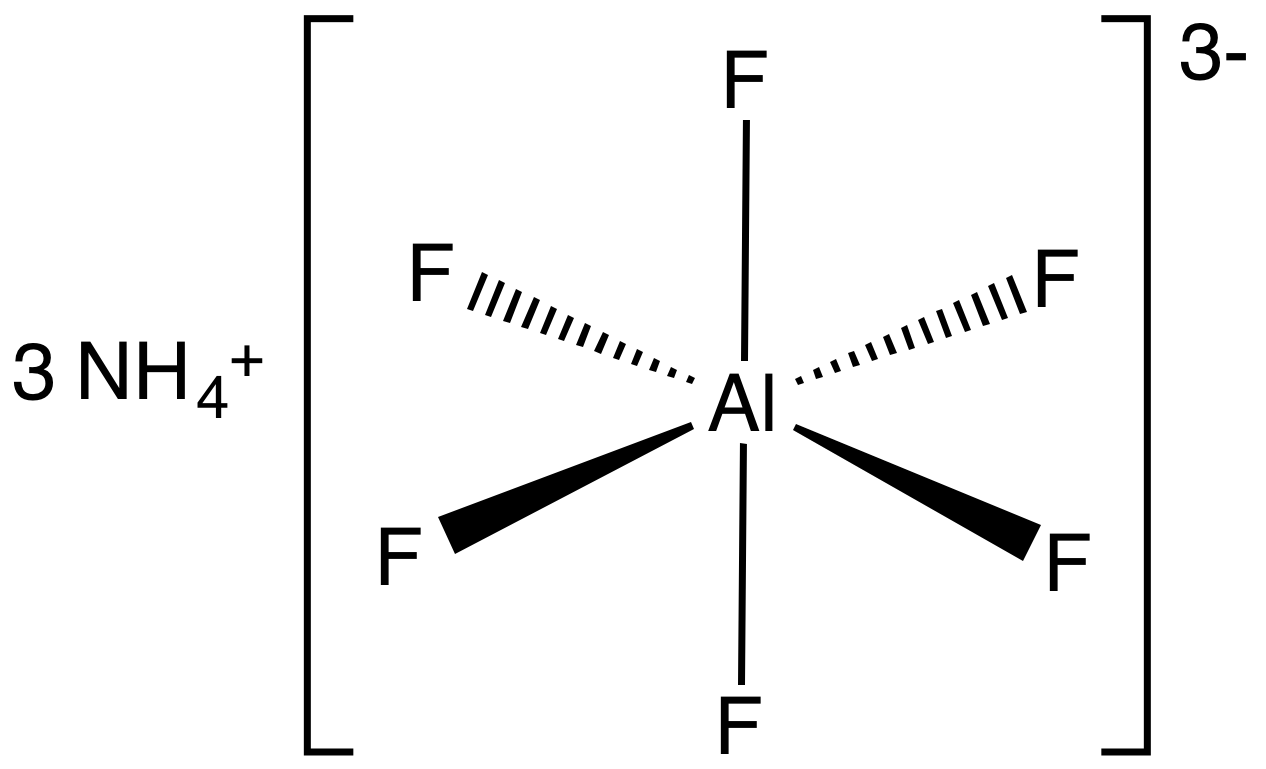

Names
- Other names Ammonium aluminium fluoride

Identifiers
CAS Number	7784-19-2
3D model (JSmol)	Interactive image
ChemSpider	11253835
ECHA InfoCard	100.029.138
EC Number	264-415-0
PubChem CID	24565
UNII	SW274S3321
CompTox Dashboard (EPA)	DTXSID401014476
- InChI: InChI=1S/Al.6FH.3H3N/h;6*1H;3*1H3/q+3;;;;;;;;;/p-3 Key: OYHBNKHFKHBTRQ-UHFFFAOYSA-K; InChI=1/Al.6FH.3H3N/h;6*1H;3*1H3/q+3;;;;;;;;;/p-3/rAlF6.3H3N/c2-1(3,4,5,6)7;;;/h;3*1H3/q-3;;;/p+3 Key: OYHBNKHFKHBTRQ-IQDJHOCXAA
- SMILES: [NH4+].[NH4+].[NH4+].F[Al-3](F)(F)(F)(F)F

Properties
Chemical formula	(NH_{4})_{3}[AlF_{6}]
Molar mass	195.09 g/mol
Appearance	White crystalline powder
Density	1.78 g/cm^{3} at 20 °C
Melting point	126.1 °C (259.0 °F; 399.2 K)
Boiling point	239.5 °C (463.1 °F; 512.6 K)

Hazards
- Occupational safety and health (OHS/OSH)
Main hazards	Irritant (Xi)
- GHS labelling
Pictograms	(GHS06: Toxic)
Signal word	Danger
Hazard statements	H301, H311, H330, H331
Precautionary statements	P260, P264, P270, P271, P280, P284, P301+P310, P302+P352, P304+P340, P310, P311, P312, P320, P321, P330, P361, P363, P403+P233, P405, P501
NFPA 704 (fire diamond)	2 0 0
- Except where otherwise noted, data are given for materials in their standard state (at 25 °C [77 °F], 100 kPa). verify (what is ?) Infobox references

Ammonium hexafluoroaluminate is an inorganic compound with the chemical formula of (NH_{4})_{3}[AlF_{6}]. It is a white solid. Upon heating, it converts to aluminium trifluoride, a reaction that releases hydrogen fluoride. It has also been used as a precursor to zeolites.

== Preparation ==
Ammonium hexafluoroaluminate can be obtained by the reaction of ammonium fluoride and aluminium hydroxide.

6 NH_{4}F + Al(OH)_{3} → (NH_{4})_{3}[AlF_{6}] + 3 NH_{4}OH
