= Simmonsite =

General
- Category: Halide
- Formula: Na_{2}LiAlF_{6}
- IMA symbol: Sim
- Strunz classification: 3.CB.15
- Crystal system: Monoclinic
- Crystal class: Pinacoidal (1̅) (same H-M symbol)*
- Space group: P2 or P2/m
- Unit cell: a = 7.536 Å, b = 11.734 Å c = 6.748 Å; α=91.70° β=93.86°, γ=104.53°; Z = 2*

Identification
- Color: Cloudy white, Cream white, pale buff
- Cleavage: None
- Fracture: Irregular/Uneven
- Tenacity: Brittle
- Mohs scale hardness: 2.5-3
- Luster: Low luster waxy or low luster greasy
- Streak: white
- Specific gravity: 3.05
- Density: 3.05 g/cm^{3}
- Optical properties: biaxial
- Refractive index: n_{α}= 1.359 n_{β}= 1.359 n_{γ}= 1.359
- Birefringence: δ=0.0009
- Pleochroism: Non-pleochroic
- Dispersion: r < v weak
- Ultraviolet fluorescence: moderately bright orange

Simmonsite is a halide mineral, being a tertiary light metal fluoride, with formula Na_{2}LiAlF_{6}. It was first discovered in nature in Mineral County in the Gillis Range of Nevada, U.S.A. The mineral is found intergrown with cryolite, cryolithionite and trace elpasolite. The mineral has a monoclinic structure of P2 or P2/m. The ideal chemical formula for simmonsite is Na_{2}LiAlF_{6}. The mineral has a no visible cleavage, Mohs hardness of 2.53, a pale white color with a white streak and feels somewhat greasy. Simmonsite was named for the Professor of Mineralogy and Petrology at the University of New Orleans, William B. Simmons.

== Occurrence ==
Simmonsite, cryolite and cryolithionite form together as part of the alumino-fluoride aassemblage in a late stage breccia pipe structure that cross the Zapot amazonite-topaz-zinnwaldite pegmatite located in the described location above in Nevada. This assemblage occurs with around a third of each of theses phases. The three phases form an intergrowth of anhedral to subhedral grains that can be micrometers to approximately two or three hundred micrometers in size. The main anhydrous alumino-fluorides results in size almost 20 cm or more across and weight more than 1 kg. Another assemblage of alumino-fluorides exist, some that contain water or hydroxyl, pachnolite, weberite, thomsenollite, prosopite, ralstonite, as well as a second generation of cryolithionite.

== Physical properties ==
Simmonsite contains no observable euhedral crystals but it does have complex polysynthetic twinning. Its color is pale buff to cream in the hadn specimens accompanied by a white streak and has a greasy appearance. It exhibits a hardness of 2.5-3 on the Mohs hardness scale. There is no apparent cleavage, a subconchoidal fracture, no parting, and is not brittle. The measured density is 3.05(2) g/cm^{3}.

== Optical properties ==
The optical properties of this mineral were discovered by using the standard optical spindle stage procedure in 589 nm light. It was determined to have birefringence with a Berek compensator.

== Chemical properties ==
Simmonsite is a fairly simple mineral chemically as the only elements present in major or minor amounts are Na, Al, Li, and F. The empirical chemical formula for simmonsite is Na_{2}LiAlF_{6}. The four primary alumino-fluorides behave distinctly different under an electron beam with elpasolite and cryolithionite showing no beam damage with time, even though simmonsite did have some and cryolite having the greatest extent of damage.

== Chemical composition ==
Oxide	wt%
Na_{2}O	31.97
Li_{2}O	7.71
Al_{2}O_{3}	26.29
F	58.79
-O=F_{2}	-24.76
Total	100.00

== X-ray crystallography ==
Natural simmonsite is monoclinic with P2 or P2/m. The unit cell dimensions are a=7.5006(6) Å, b= 7.474(1) Å, c= 7.503(1) Å, β = 90.847(9)°, V= 420.6(1) Å3, Z= 4. These dimensions are almost identical to those of babingtonite. Simmonsite has had a long history of it being difficult to understand as there have been previous studies trying to understand the crystallography. Errors were discovered in previous work by Holm and Holm(1970) that suggested it was monoclinic, B-centered, a=7.54 Å, b= 7.52 Å, c= 7.53 Å, β = 90.81°.

== See also ==
List of Minerals
