= Håleniusite-(La) =

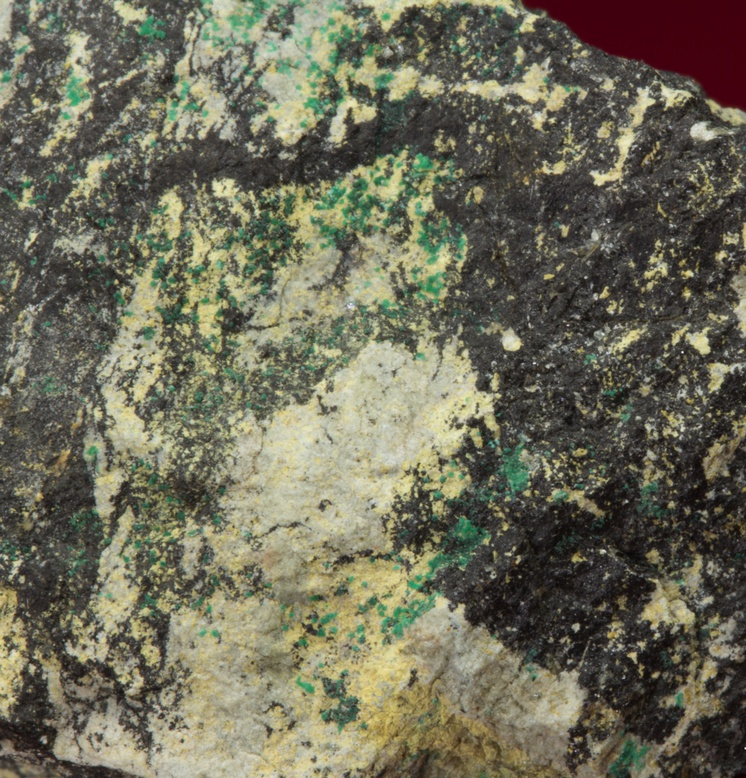
- Håleniusite-(La) (yellow) with other minerals

General
- Category: Minerals
- Formula: (La,Ce)OF
- IMA symbol: Hål-La
- Strunz classification: 3/A.08-25
- Crystal system: Isometric
- Space group: Fm3̅m (No. 225)
- Unit cell: 178.26 Å³ (Calculated from Unit Cell)

Identification
- Formula mass: 174.90 gm
- Colour: Lemon yellow to ochre yellow
- Luster: Dull, earthy
- Streak: Light yellow
- Diaphaneity: Translucent
- Specific gravity: 6.5
- Density: 6.5 g/cm^{3} (Measured)

Håleniusite-(La), chemical formula (La,Ce)OF. is a yellow isometric mineral. It has a dull, earthy lustre. The geological setting of håleniusite-(La) is in vugs and leaching zones of massive ferriallanite-(Ce), intimately intergrown with cerite-(Ce) and bastnäsite-(La).

It was discovered in 1986 at Bastnäs mines, Riddarhyttan, Skinnskatteberg, Västmanland, Sweden and named in honour of Ulf Hålenius, director of the mineralogy department at the Swedish Museum of Natural History in Stockholm, Sweden.
