= Neighborite =

Halide mineral

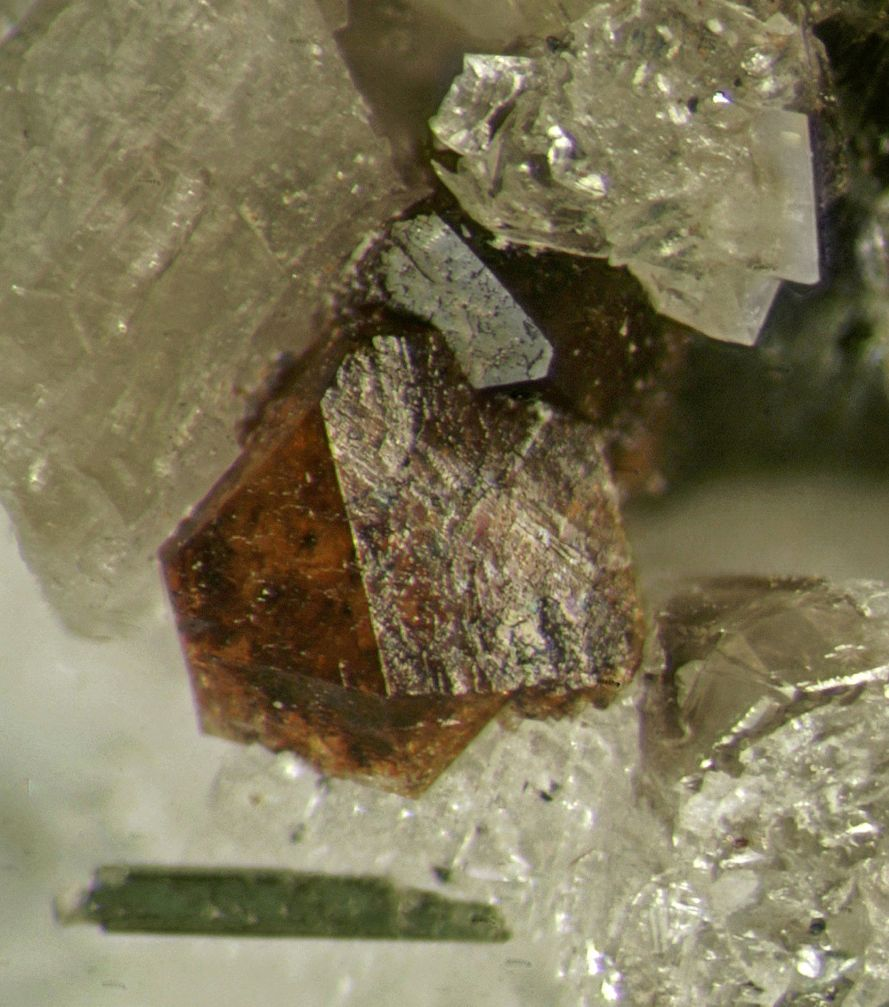

General
- Category: Halide
- Formula: NaMgF_{3}
- IMA symbol: Nbo
- Strunz classification: 3/C.03-70
- Crystal system: Orthorhombic
- Crystal class: mmm(2/m 2/m 2/m)
- Space group: Pcmn
- Unit cell: a = 5.363 Å, b = 7.676 Å c = 5.503 Å; Z = 4

Identification
- Color: Colorless, mahogany, brown
- Crystal habit: Subangular rounds or octahedra
- Twinning: Interpenatration
- Fracture: Uneven
- Mohs scale hardness: 4.5
- Luster: Vitreous
- Diaphaneity: Transparent to opaque
- Specific gravity: 3.03
- Density: 3.03 g/cm^{3} Measured; 3.06 g/cm^{3} Calculated
- Optical properties: Anisotropic
- Refractive index: 1.364±0.002
- Birefringence: δ=0.003
- Dispersion: r < v weak

Neighborite is a mineral composed of a double fluoride salt of sodium and magnesium. It was initially recognized as pink and brown masses of round grains in the Green River Formation South of Ouray, Utah. Originally found in dark dolomitic oil shales, neighborite typically forms as subrounded or octahedral crystals. Neighborite received its name from Frank Neighbor, a geologist for the Sun Oil Co. based in Salt Lake City, Utah. Due to Mr. Neighbor's work in discovering neighborite, along with other newly discovered minerals to the Green River Formation, the mineral was named after him. Neighborite is in the family of perovskite crystal structure minerals, possessing a general formula of ABX_{3}.

== Occurrence ==
Neighborite is found in association with minerals such as burbankite, nahcolite, wurtzite, barytocalcite, garrelsite, pyrite, calcite, and quartz. The mineral most commonly occurs on top of dark colored dolomitic oil shales. The resulting grains are subrounded in shape. Some neighborite crystals form as inclusions in barytocalcite. Octahedral crystals of neighborite exist in nature, but is generally uncommon relative to the subangular crystals. Neighborite is a rare mineral, only being found in select localities around the world. Regions where neighborite is currently found include select wells in or near Ouray, Utah; Montreal, Quebec; Oslo, Norway; Murmansk Oblast, Russia; Arusha, Tanzania.

== Physical properties ==
Neighborite is a colorless or pink to brown colored mineral exhibiting a vitreous luster. It exhibits a hardness of 4.5 on the Mohs hardness scale. It does not portray any specific cleavage planes, but instead exhibits an uneven fracture. Neighborite is insoluble in distilled water, but dissolves at a quicker rate with increased acidic conditions.

== Optical properties ==
Neighborite is an anisotropic mineral, meaning it has more than one refractive index. However, the birefringence of the mineral is rather low, at 0.003. The measured refractive indexes are 1.364±0.002. The octahedral {111} crystals of neighborite occasionally exhibit twinning. {100} cubic faces also exist as truncations.

== Chemical properties ==
Neighborite belongs to the perovskite family of minerals. These minerals have a general formula of ABX_{3}. The structure consists of B atoms in an octahedron, with A and X atoms forming the cubic and octahedral cells of the structure, respectively. Perovskites are most notably used as solar cells, achieving a general efficiency of around 25%.

== Chemical composition ==
Element	wt%
Na	22.05
Mg	23.31
F	54.64
Total	100.00

== X-ray crystallography ==
Neighborite is an orthorhombic mineral, containing the space group Pcmn. The unit cell dimensions are a=5.363 Å, b=7.676 Å, c=5.503 Å, α=90.00°, β=90.00°, γ=90.00°. The dimensions of neighborite are extremely similar to those of a basic perovskite structure. It is therefore considered part of the perovskite supergroup of minerals. As higher temperatures are achieved, the three axes lengths of neighborite get closer together. At 900°C, the axes lengths are equal, giving neighborite a cubic cell. However, this cubic structure cannot be quenched, and can only exist at the high temperature range.

== See also ==
- List of minerals
