= Abhurite =

Mineral of tin, oxygen, hydrogen, and chlorine

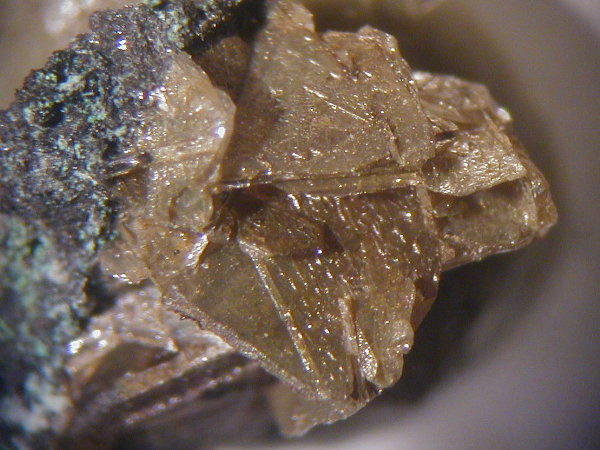
- Brownish tabular crystals of abhurite from Shipwreck "Hydra", South coast of Norway

General
- Category: Halide mineral
- Formula: Sn_{21}O_{6}(OH)_{14}Cl_{16}
- IMA symbol: Abh
- Strunz classification: 3.DA.30
- Crystal system: Trigonal
- Crystal class: Trapezohedral (32); H-M symbol: (32)
- Space group: R3 2
- Unit cell: a = 10.0175 Å, c = 44.014 Å; Z=3

Identification
- Color: Colorless/Pale yellow-greenish
- Crystal habit: Platy, thin crystals, cryptocrystalline crusts
- Twinning: On 0001
- Cleavage: None
- Fracture: Hackly
- Tenacity: Fragile
- Mohs scale hardness: 2
- Streak: White
- Diaphaneity: Transparent
- Specific gravity: 4.42
- Density: 4.42 g/cm3 (Measured) 4.417 g/cm3 (Calculated)
- Optical properties: Uniaxial (+)
- Refractive index: n_{ω} = 2.060 n_{ε} = 2.110
- Birefringence: δ = 0.050
- Other characteristics: opalescent

Abhurite is a mineral of tin, oxygen, hydrogen, and chlorine with the formula Sn_{21}O_{6}(OH)_{14}Cl_{16} or Sn_{3}O(OH)_{2}Cl_{2}. It is named after its type locality, a shipwreck with tin ingots at Sharm Abhur, a cove near Jeddah in the Red Sea. Abhurite forms alongside other tin minerals like romarchite and cassiterite. Abhurite can vary in color, from pale green/yellow to darker brown/green.

== Locality and formation ==
Abhurite is attributed for forming on tin materials when in contact with sea water. The mineral was described in 1977 from a shipwreck near Hidra Island, Norway, where it occurred on pewter plates. However, that report was not recognized by the International Mineralogical Association. Along with Sharm Abhur and the shipwreck near Hidra Island, abhurite was found on tin ingots in the Uluburun shipwreck. On the ingots, it was found with other tin minerals like cassiterite and romarchite, and calcium carbonate minerals like calcite and aragonite.

== See also ==
- List of minerals
