= Zharchikhite =

General
- Category: Halide mineral
- Formula: AlF(OH)_{2}
- IMA symbol: Zha
- Strunz classification: 3.AC.05
- Crystal system: Monoclinic, pseudo-orthorhombic

Identification
- Colour: Colorless
- Crystal habit: Elongated prismatic cryatals, massive, drusy coatings
- Cleavage: Perfect (010)
- Tenacity: Very brittle
- Mohs scale hardness: 4.5
- Luster: Vitreous
- Diaphaneity: Transparent
- Specific gravity: 2.81
- Optical properties: Biaxial (-)
- Refractive index: nα = 1.532 nβ = 1.552 nγ = 1.567
- Birefringence: δ = 0.035
- 2V angle: 80° (calculated)

Zharchikhite is a halide mineral, a hydroxyl fluoride of aluminium; formula AlF(OH)_{2}. It forms colourless, transparent crystals. Discovered in 1968, it is named after its original locality, the Zharchinskoya Deposit, which is in Buryatia, Russia.
