= Ferruccio Zambonini =

Ferruccio Zambonini (17 December 1880 – 12 January 1932) was an Italian mineralogist and geologist. Most of his time he worked on the geology and mineralogy of Mount Vesuvius.

== Life and work ==
Zambonini was born in Rome and studied at the university there. From 1906 on he worked in the Mineralogical Museum at the University of Naples. In 1909 he changed to the University of Sassari, but he returned to Naples in 1926, where he held a chair for general chemistry.

== Honours ==
The minerals Ferruccite and Zamboninite were named after him.
