= Rosenbergite =

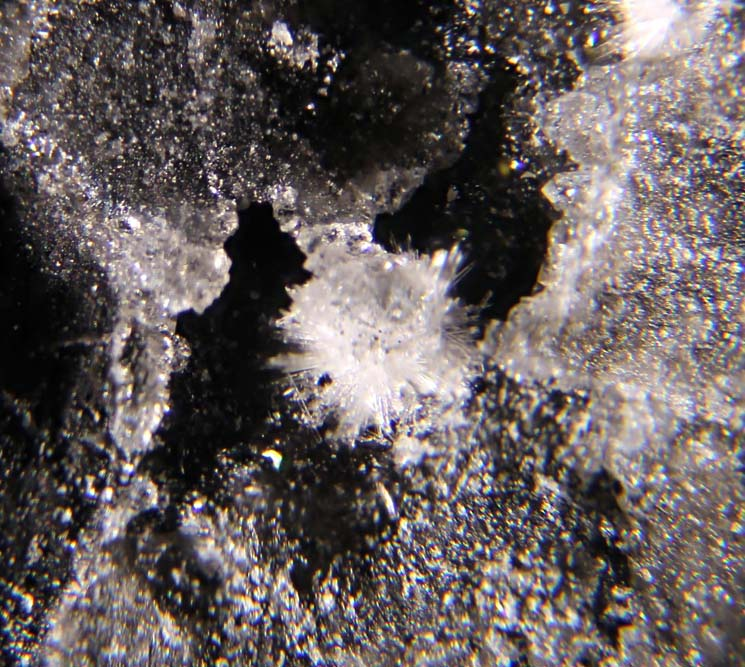
- Acicular rosenbergite crystals from Le Cetine Mine, Siena, Tuscany, Italy

General
- Category: Minerals
- Formula: AlF_{3}·3H_{2}O
- IMA symbol: Ros
- Crystal system: Tetragonal
- Crystal class: 4
- Space group: P4/n (no. 85)

Identification
- Mohs scale hardness: 3–3.5

Rosenbergite is a mineral with the chemical formula AlF_{3}·3H_{2}O. It is a trihydrate of aluminium fluoride.

It is colorless. Its crystals are tetragonal to dipyramidal. It is named after Philip E. Rosenberg, a United States geochemist. It is found in the Celtine Mine in Tuscany, Italy and Mount Erebus, Ross Island, Antarctica. It is not radioactive. Rosenbergite is rated 3–3.5 on the Mohs Scale.
