= Pinalite =

Rare lead tungstate–chloride mineral

General
- Category: Tungstate mineral
- Formula: Pb_{3}WO_{5}Cl_{2}
- IMA symbol: Pnl
- Strunz classification: 3.DC.55
- Crystal system: Orthorhombic
- Crystal class: Dypyramidal (mmm); H-M symbol: (2/m 2/m 2/m)
- Space group: Orthorhombic; Space group: Amam
- Unit cell: a = 11.07 Å, b = 13.08 Å, c = 5.62 Å; Z = 4

Identification
- Color: Bright to pale yellow, golden, orange
- Crystal habit: Acicular - occurs as needle-like crystals. Bladed - aggregates of thin lath-like crystals (e.g. kyanite)
- Twinning: Penetration twins on {010}
- Cleavage: None
- Tenacity: Brittle
- Luster: Adamantine
- Diaphaneity: Transparent
- Specific gravity: 7.78 (calculated)
- Optical properties: Biaxial (+)
- Refractive index: n_{α} = 2.490 n_{β} = 2.495 n_{γ} = 2.505
- Birefringence: δ = 0.015
- 2V angle: Measured: 70° to 70.5°, calculated: 72°
- Ultraviolet fluorescence: Non-fluorescent

Pinalite is a rare lead tungstate–chloride mineral with formula: Pb_{3}WO_{5}Cl_{2}.

Pinalite crystallizes in the orthorhombic crystal system. The orthorhombic system is described as having three crystallographic axes of unequal lengths, normally referred to as c (the longest axis), b (the second longest axis), and a (the smallest axis). These axes all have corresponding angles of 90 degrees. Pinalite belongs to the biaxial optical class, and is negative. The main difference between biaxial and axial crystals is that biaxial crystals have two optic axes.

Pinalite's structure is significant in that it is one of a kind. It is therefore important in seeing how the structures in new lead oxyhalides (containing square pyramids incorporated into sheets) are arranged. Its structure contains an extra oxygen, which therefore has a very small amount of free space and consequently protrudes into neighboring layers. The oxygen then pushes aside the chlorine atoms, leaving almost no room for the lead to occupy. This is of interest to geologists for it is such a rare occurrence of structure seen only in pinalite and its barium analog. Therefore, it could be of use to structuralists to see how this mineral was formed. Experiments have been done, using lead oxyhalides, to see the reason and sequence of events in which this mineral is executed.

== Discovery and occurrence ==
Pinalite was first discovered in 1989 in the St. Anthony deposit, Tiger, Mammoth District, Pinal Co., Arizona, US, and was named for the location county. Pinalite has otherwise only been seen in the Grand Reef mine, near Klondyke in the Santa Teresa Mountains in Graham County, Arizona, so is therefore found around orogenic activity.
