= Yttrocerite =

Mineral flourite

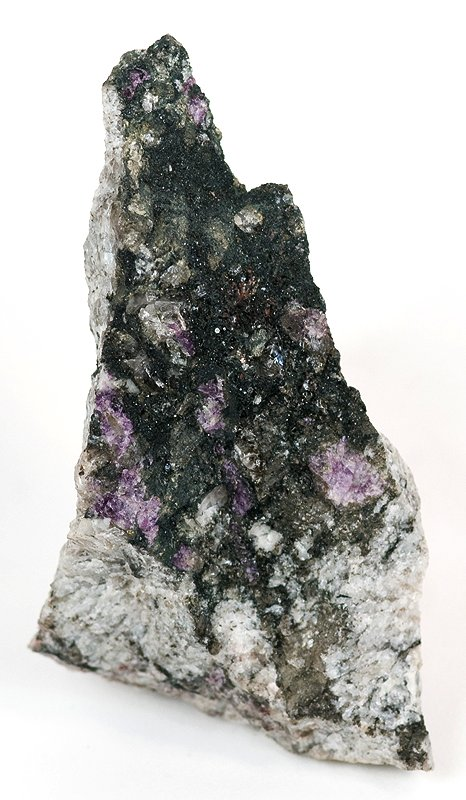

General
- Category: Mineral variety
- Formula: CaF_{2} + (Y,Ce)F_{3}

Identification
- Crystal habit: Cubic
- Mohs scale hardness: 4-5

Yttrocerite is a variety of the mineral fluorite with a chemical formula CaF_{2}+(Y,Ce)F_{3}. It is bluish red with isometric crystals and is named for the yttrium and cerium it contains. It has a Mohs hardness of 4–5. It has been found in Sweden, several states in the United States and Norway. It is not a mineral species approved by International Mineralogical Association.
