= Yedlinite =

Hydrated oxyhalide mineral

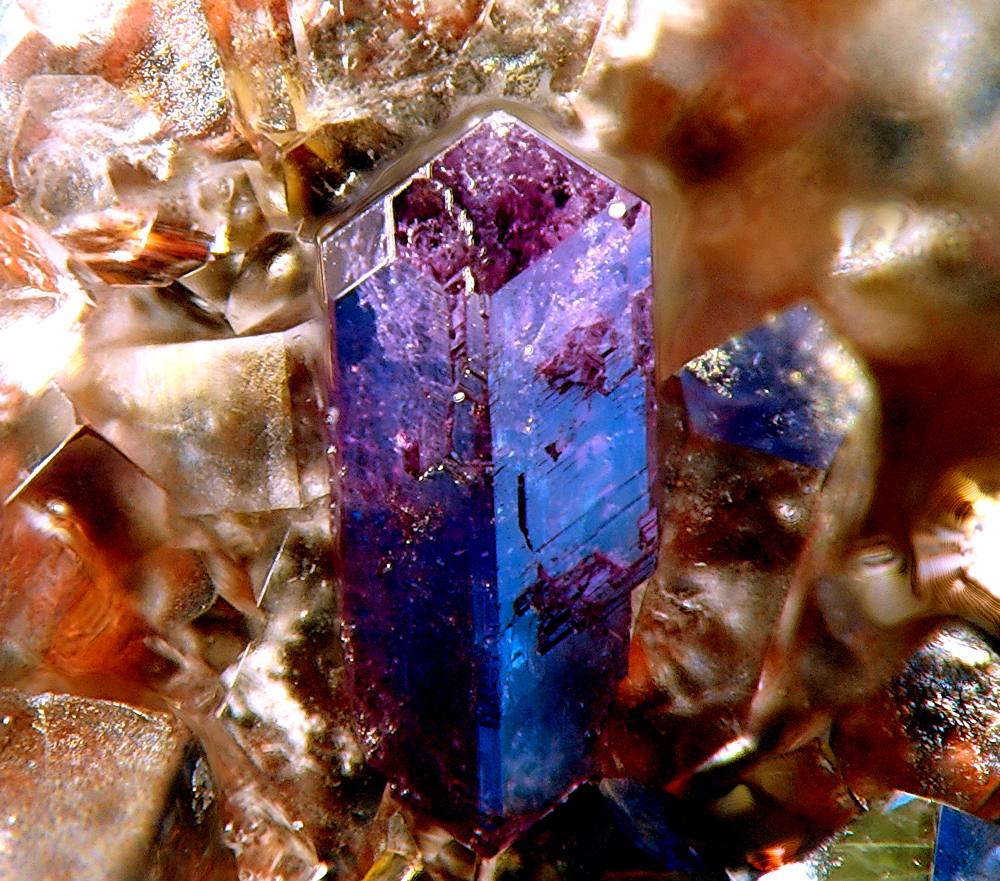
- Yedlinite from Mammoth-Saint Anthony Mine, Tiger, Arizona

General
- Category: Oxyhalide minerals
- IMA symbol: Yed
- IMA status: Approved
- Strunz classification: 3.DB.50
- Dana classification: 10.6.3.1
- Crystal system: Trigonal
- Crystal class: 3̅
- Space group: R3̅

Identification
- Color: Red-violet
- Crystal habit: Prismatic
- Cleavage: {1120}
- Tenacity: Sectile
- Mohs scale hardness: 2.5
- Luster: Sub-Vitreous, Greasy
- Streak: White
- Specific gravity: 5.85
- Density: 5.85 g/cc

Yedlinite is a hydrated oxyalide mineral found in Tiger, Arizona, with the formula Pb_{6}CrCl_{6}(O,OH,H_{2}O)_{8}. Yedlinite occurs as crystals up to 1 mm long. It was first noted in 1967 by amature mineralogist Neal Yedlin, and was named after him.

== Formation ==
Yedlinite can form when Double terminated quartz crystals form a framework for diaboleite deposition. This is later replaced by phosgenite or matlockite, which yedlinite is commonly found growing on.

It is also rarely found upon dioptase, fluorite, and drusy quartz.
