= Mammothite =

Mineral

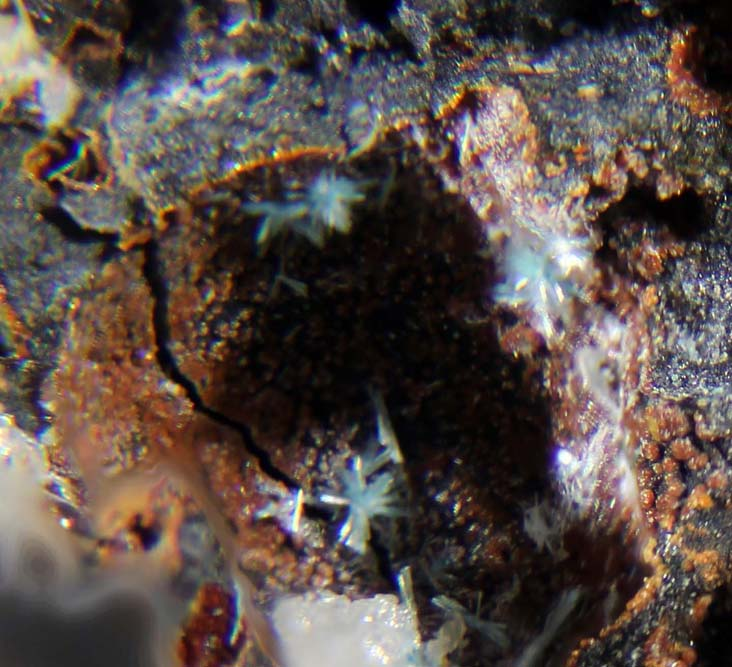
- Sky blue acicular crystals of mammothite in a specimen from the famous Lavrion deposit (Attica, Greece).

General
- Category: Sulfates
- Formula: Pb_{6}Cu_{4}AlSb^{5+}O_{2}(OH)_{16}Cl_{4}(SO_{4})_{2}
- IMA symbol: Mm
- Strunz classification: 8th Edition, 6/B.10-50
- Crystal system: Monoclinic
- Crystal class: 2-Sphenoidal
- Space group: C2
- Unit cell: a = 18.93(3) Å, b = 7.33(1) Å c = 11.35(2) Å; β=112.44(10)°, Z = 2

Identification
- Color: Cerulean blue, blue-green, pale blue
- Crystal habit: Tabular to prismatic and acicular crystals, radial aggregates
- Cleavage: Distinct on {010}, Good
- Fracture: Irregular, Uneven
- Tenacity: Brittle
- Mohs scale hardness: 3
- Luster: Sub-Vitreous, Resinous
- Streak: Pale blue
- Diaphaneity: Transparent
- Density: 5.25 g/cm^{3}
- Optical properties: biaxial positive
- Refractive index: n_{α}= 1.868 n_{β}= 1.892 n_{γ}= 1.928
- Birefringence: δ=0.060
- Pleochroism: Visible
- Dispersion: r > v

Mammothite is a mineral found in the Mammoth mine in Tiger, Arizona and also in Laurium, Attika, Greece. This mineral was named in 1985 by Donald R. Peacor, Pete J. Dunn, G. Schnorrer-Köhler, and Richard A. Bideaux, for the Mammoth vein (one of the two main veins in the mine) and the town of Mammoth, Arizona, which was named for the mine. The mammothite that is found in Arizona exist as euhedral crystals imbedded in micro granular, white colored anglesite with a saccharoidal texture. The associated minerals include phosgenite, wulfenite, leadhillite and caledonite. In Greece, the mammothite exists as small euhedral crystals and also as microscopic rock cavities lined with projecting crystals within the slags. The associated minerals here are cerussite, phosgenite and matlockite. The ideal chemical formula for mammothite is Pb_{6}Cu_{4}AlSb^{5+}O_{2}(OH)_{16}Cl_{4}(SO_{4})_{2}.

== Occurrence ==
Mammothite is associated with various minerals but different minerals at different locations. In the Mammoth mine in Tiger, Arizona this mineral is associated with phosgenite, wulfenite, leadhillite and caledonite. There are roughly 100 different kinds of mineral species in the Mammoth mine and about 25 of these are considered to be a part of an anomalous oxidized sequence. These minerals will grow in close quarters with each other but other minerals containing Pb, Cu, Fe, and Zn are also present. The minerals contained in this abnormal sequence contain Pb, Cu, SO_{4}, and CO_{3} and they may occur in the same minerals. The element Antimony is a very rare element that is exhibited in mammothite but also in the mineral tetrahedrite, which is seen having small crystals that are attached to pyrite crystals. In Laurium, Attika, Greece, the mammothite exists as small euhedral crystals and also as microscopic rock cavities lined with projecting crystals within the slags. The associated minerals here are cerussite, phosgenite and matlockite.

== Physical properties ==
Mammothite is a cerulean blue to pale blue, transparent mineral with a resinous or subvitreous luster. It exhibits a hardness of 3 on the Mohs hardness scale. Mammothite occur as tabular to acicular crystals that exhibit radial aggregates. In Arizona, mammothite is mostly tabular but several samples are elongated on the [001] axis. In Tiger, Arizona, crystals are less than 1.0 mm in size. The density was difficult to be measured due to the small size and an abundance of other minerals attached to it. By using heavy liquid techniques, it was determined to be greater than 4.2g/cm^{3} but the idealized end member was calculated to be 5.25g/cm^{3}. In Laurium, Greece, this mineral is different in appearance. The color of the samples may range from pale blue to white. The crystals in Greece are very small and can exhibit two habits. These habits include being prismatic and bladed; or being very prismatic and elongated on the [001] axis. Mammothite is brittle and shows distinct cleavage along the {010} plane. The measured density is 5.25 g/cm^{3}.

== Optical properties ==
Mammothite is biaxial positive, which means it will refract light along two axes. It exhibits a 2V_{(measured)}=80°, strong dispersion with r>v, and displays visible pleochroism with varying colors of shades of pale blue. The indices of refraction are α=1.868, β=1.892, γ=1.928. Mammothite is also transparent and does not respond to ultraviolet radiation.

== Chemical properties ==
The chemical formula for mammothite is Pb_{6}Cu_{4}AlSb^{5+}O_{2}(OH)_{16}Cl_{4}(SO_{4})_{2}. Mammothite is one of the few minerals that has an Sb atom in the pentavalent state.

== Chemical composition ==
Oxide	wt%
Al_{2}O_{3}	2.3
CuO	14.9
PbO	57.6
Sb_{2}O_{3}	8.48
SO_{3}	7.7
Cl	5.7
H_{2}O	7.0
O=Cl	1.3
Total	100.00

This microprobe analyses was done on the mammothite from Tiger, Arizona. These crystals were analyzed by using an ARL-SEMQ electron microprobe that used an operating voltage of 15 kV and a sample current of 0.025 μA. The resulted values were then used to get the weight percentages of the sample of mammothite. However, samples of mammothite that were found in Greece were too small to be able to perform this same analyses. The Laurium samples were identified to be mammothite by using the X-ray diffraction method.

== X-ray crystallography ==
Mammothite is in the monoclinic crystal system, with space group C2. The unit cell dimensions are a=18.93(3) Å, b=7.33(1) Å, c=11.35(2) Å, β=112.44(10)°. These values were obtained through powder diffraction that was found by using a 114.6 mm diameter Gandolfi camera, CuKα X-radiation, polycrystalline sample and a silicon sample as an internal standard.

== See also ==
List of Minerals
