= Paralaurionite =

Colorless mineral

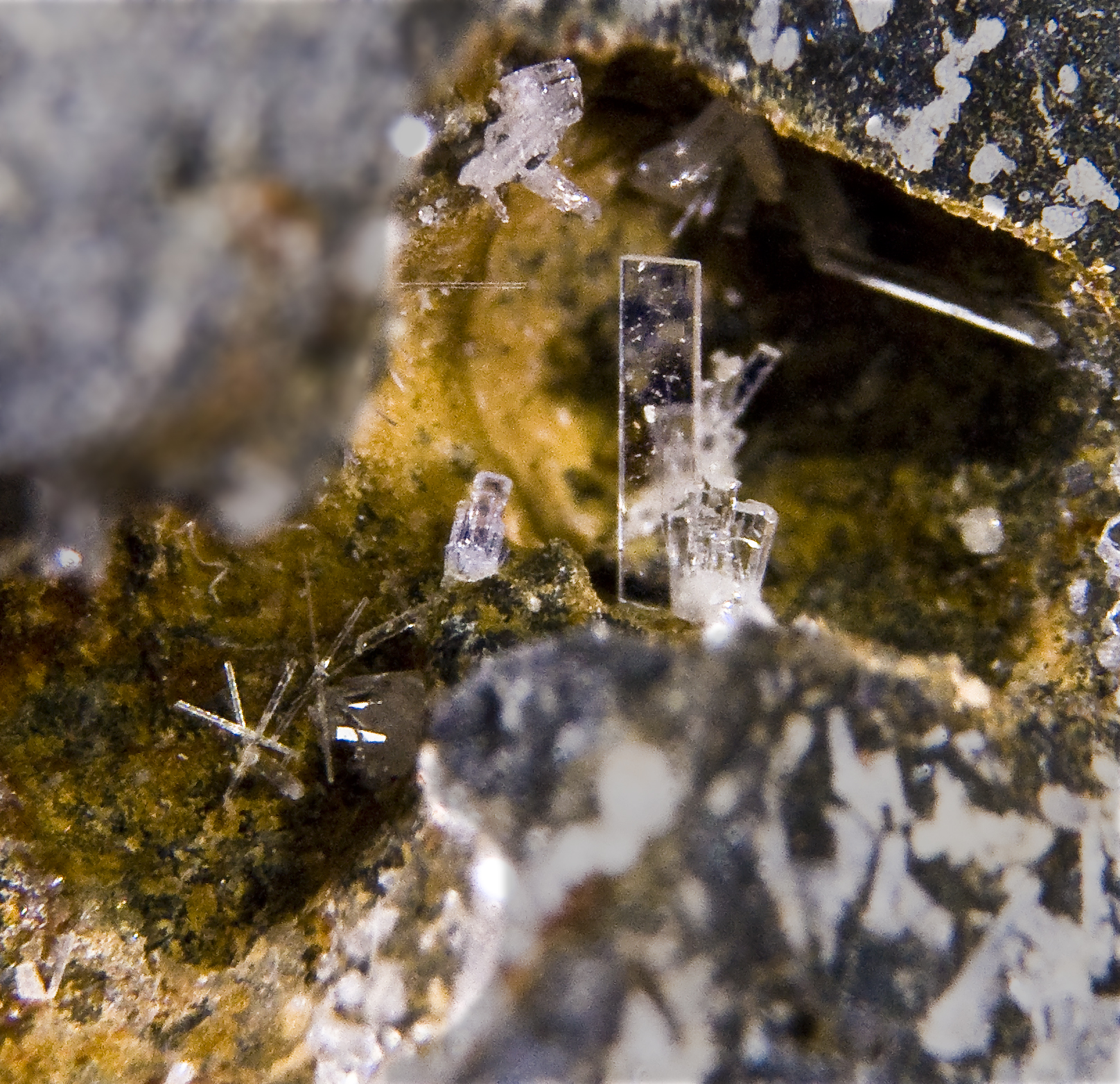
- Platey clear paralaurionite crystals from slag in the Thorikos area, Lavrion, Attica, Greece

General
- Category: Halide mineral
- Formula: PbCl(OH)
- IMA symbol: Plri
- Strunz classification: 3.DC.05
- Crystal system: Monoclinic
- Crystal class: Prismatic (2/m) (same H-M symbol)
- Space group: C2/m
- Unit cell: a = 10.865(4) Å, b = 4.006(2) Å, c = 7.233(3) Å; β = 117.24(4)°; Z = 4

Identification
- Color: Colorless, white, pale greenish, yellowish, yellow-orange, rarely violet
- Crystal habit: Elongated tabular crystals
- Twinning: Contact twinning on {100}
- Cleavage: Perfect on {001}
- Tenacity: Flexible, non-elastic
- Mohs scale hardness: 3
- Luster: Subadamantine
- Diaphaneity: Transparent to translucent
- Specific gravity: 6.05–6.15
- Optical properties: Biaxial (−)
- Refractive index: n_{α} = 2.050 n_{β} = 2.150 n_{γ} = 2.200
- Birefringence: δ = 0.150
- Pleochroism: Visible

Paralaurionite is a colorless mineral consisting of a basic lead chloride PbCl(OH) that is dimorphous with laurionite. It is a member of the matlockite group. The name is derived from para-, the Greek for "near", and laurionite, because of its polymorphic relationship to it. Bright, yellow tips of thorikosite can form on paralaurionite crystals and paralaurionite may also be intergrown with mendipite.

== Occurrence ==
It was first described in 1899 for an occurrence in slag in Laurium, Attica, Greece. In 1952 an occurrences of it was reported from the Mammoth Mine, Arizona.

It occurs in lead bearing slag which has been exposed to seawater. It also occurs in polymetallic ore deposits. It occurs associated with laurionite, penfieldite, fiedlerite, phosgenite in slag deposits; and with leadhillite, matlockite, cerussite, hydrocerussite, diaboleite and wherryite in the Mammoth mine location.

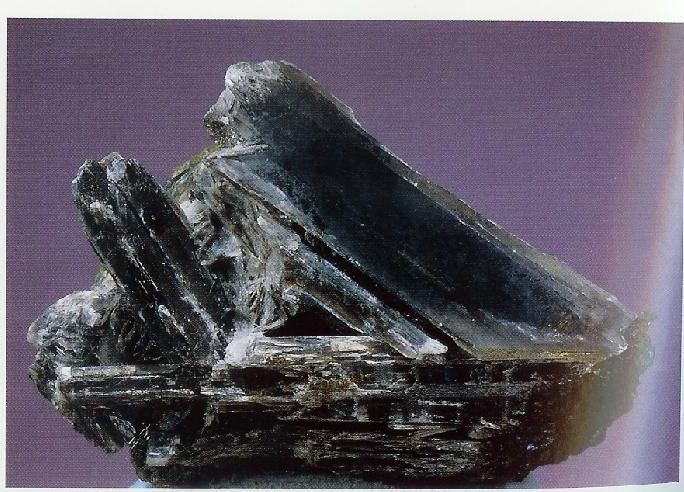
Unusually large crystals of Paralaurionite, Touissit, Oujda-Angad Province, Morocco. Size: 6 x 5.5 x 5 cm.
