= Boleite =

Complex halide mineral

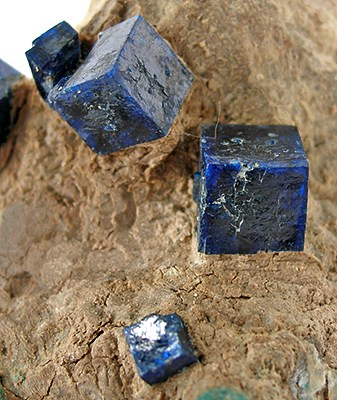

General
- Category: Halide mineral
- Formula: KPb_{26}Ag_{9}Cu_{24}(OH)_{48}Cl_{62}
- IMA symbol: Bol
- Strunz classification: 3.DB.15
- Crystal system: Isometric
- Crystal class: Hexoctahedral (m3̅m); H-M symbol: (4/m 3̅ 2/m)
- Space group: Pm3̅m
- Unit cell: a = 15.29 Å; Z = 1

Identification
- Color: Deep Prussian blue to indigo
- Crystal habit: Cubic crystals
- Cleavage: [001] perfect
- Fracture: Uneven
- Mohs scale hardness: 3.0 – 3.5
- Luster: Vitreous to pearly
- Streak: Greenish blue
- Diaphaneity: Translucent
- Specific gravity: 5.054
- Optical properties: Isotropic
- Refractive index: n = 2.05
- Other characteristics: Radioactive 0.36% (K)

Boleite is a complex halide mineral with formula: KPb_{26}Ag_{9}Cu_{24}(OH)_{48}Cl_{62}. It was first described in 1891 as an oxychloride mineral. It is an isometric mineral which forms in deep-blue cubes. There are numerous minerals related to boleite, such as pseudoboleite, cumengite, and diaboleite, and these all have the same complex crystal structure. They all contain bright-blue cubic forms and are formed in altered zones of lead and copper deposits, produced during the reaction of chloride bearing solutions with primary sulfide minerals.

== Physical properties ==
The external property of a boleite crystal structure indicates its cubic structure. It is classified under the isometric crystal class. Boleite has a perfect cleavage in the [001] direction, and has a very dark glossy blue color with a light greenish-blue color streak. Twinning is best shown in this mineral by notches along the interpenetrated angles, which results in a crystal habit of pseudocubic penetration twinning along three different angles perpendicular to one another. Boleite has cubes over half an inch on each side, which consist of pseudo-octahedral tetragonal dipyramids.

== Geologic occurrence ==
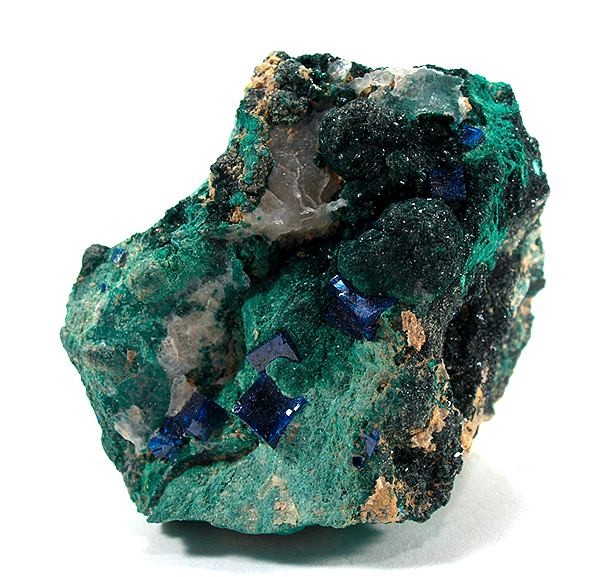
Boleite and atacamite from the Santa Rosa Mine, Noche Buena, Mazapil Municipality, Zacatecas, Mexico

Boleite was first collected as a very minor ore of silver, copper and lead at Boleo, Mexico. Boleite was named after its place of discovery, El Boleo mine, on the Baja Peninsula, near Santa Rosalia, Mexico.

Minerals associated with boleite include pseudoboleite, cumengeite, atacamite, anglesite, cerussite, phosgenite and gypsum at the type locality in Boleo, Mexico. In the Mammoth-St. Anthony mine of Arizona associated minerals include pseudoboleite, anglesite, cerussite, atacamite, paratacamite, leadhillite, paralaurionite, caledonite, phosgenite, matlockite and bideauxite.
