= Barium chloride fluoride =

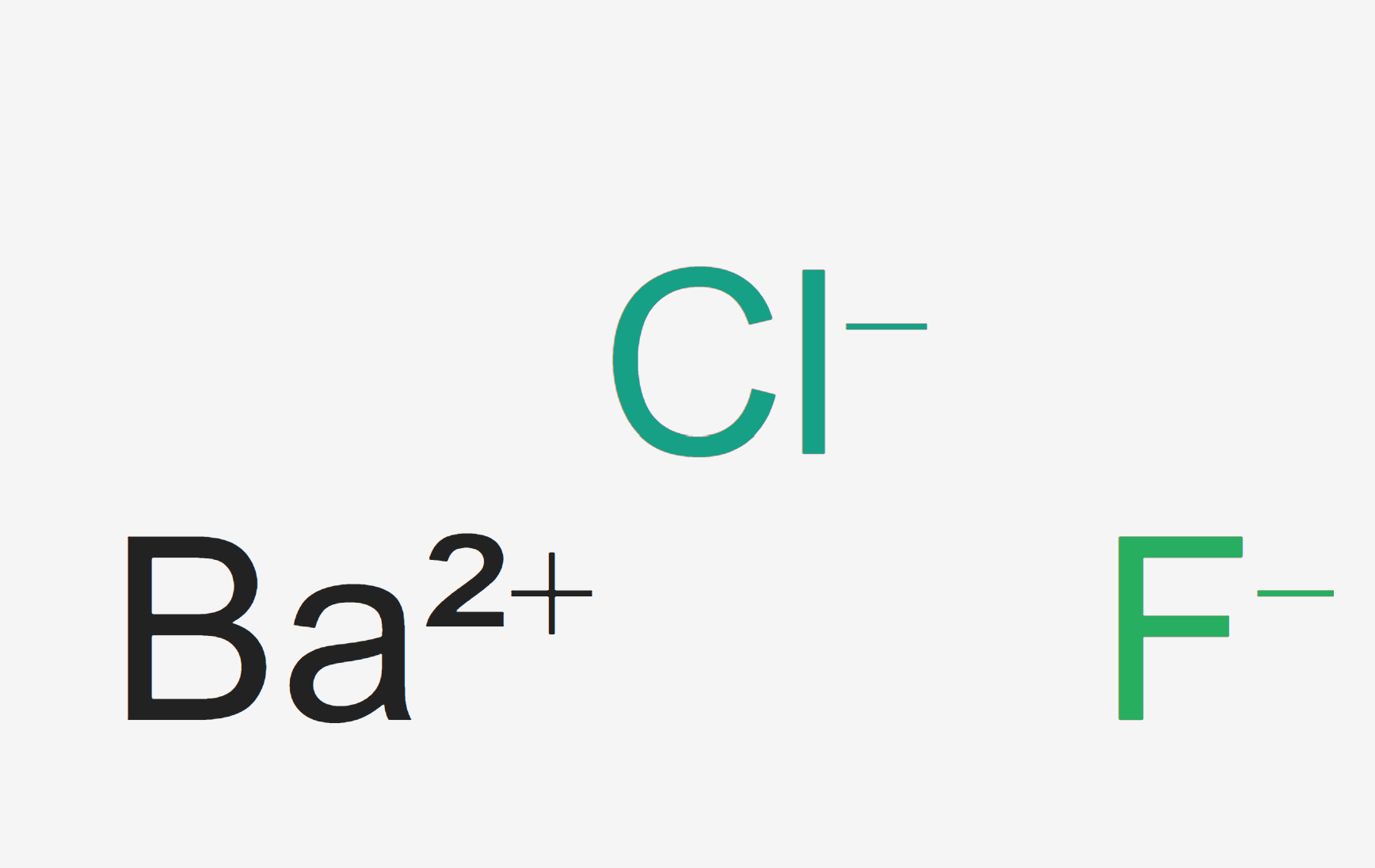

Names
- Other names Barium chlorofluoride, barium fluorochloride

Identifiers
CAS Number	13718-55-3
3D model (JSmol)	Interactive image
ChemSpider	75508
ECHA InfoCard	100.033.874
EC Number	237-277-4
PubChem CID	83685
CompTox Dashboard (EPA)	7065598
- InChI: InChI=1S/Ba.ClH.FH/h;2*1H/q+2;;/p-2 Key: RBRFDGCVTRKUEW-UHFFFAOYSA-L
- SMILES: [F-].[Cl-].[Ba+2]

Properties
Chemical formula	BaClF
Molar mass	191.78 g·mol^{−1}
Appearance	white crystals
Density	g/cm^{3}
Solubility in water	Poorly soluble

Structure
Crystal structure	Tetragonal

Related compounds
Related compounds	Strontium fluorochloride; Lead fluorochloride
- Except where otherwise noted, data are given for materials in their standard state (at 25 °C [77 °F], 100 kPa). Infobox references

Barium chloride fluoride is an inorganic chemical compound of barium, chlorine, and fluorine. Its chemical formula is BaClF. The compound naturally occurs as zhangpeishanite mineral of the matlockite group. One of the deposits where the mineral is mined is Bayan Obo in China.

== Synthesis ==
Barium chloride fluoride can be prepared by precipitating barium chloride and ammonium fluoride in a solution.

The compound can also be obtained by melting BaF_{2} with BaCl_{2}.

BaF_{2} + BaCl_{2} → 2BaFCl

== Physical properties ==
Barium chloride fluoride forms white crystals. The crystal structure of BaClF is a tetragonal distortion of that of fluoride type BaF_{2}.

The compound is poorly soluble in water.
