= Strontium fluorochloride =

Inorganic chemical compound

Names
- Other names Strontium fluoride chloride, strontium fluoro-chloride

Identifiers
3D model (JSmol)	Interactive image
PubChem CID	159591500
- InChI: InChI=1S/ClH.FH.Sr/h2*1H;/q;;+2/p-2 Key: MKHLNMLOOQGRBL-UHFFFAOYSA-L
- SMILES: [F-].[Cl-].[Sr+2]

Properties
Chemical formula	SrFCl
Appearance	crystals

Structure
Crystal structure	tetragonal
Space group	P4/mmm

Related compounds
Related compounds	Barium fluorochloride; Lead fluorochloride
- Except where otherwise noted, data are given for materials in their standard state (at 25 °C [77 °F], 100 kPa). Infobox references

Strontium fluorochloride or strontium fluoride chloride is an inorganic compound of strontium, fluorine, and chlorine with the chemical formula SrFCl.

== Synthesis ==
The compound can be obtained by melting SrF_{2} with SrCl_{2}.

SrF_{2} + SrCl_{2} → 2SrFCl

== Physical properties ==
The compound forms crystals of tetragonal system, matlockite-type structure PbFCl, space group P4/mmm.

== Uses ==
The compound is known for its potential in applications like phototheranostics, pressure and temperature sensing, and as a precursor for obtaining other compounds.
