= Chloroxiphite =

Mineral

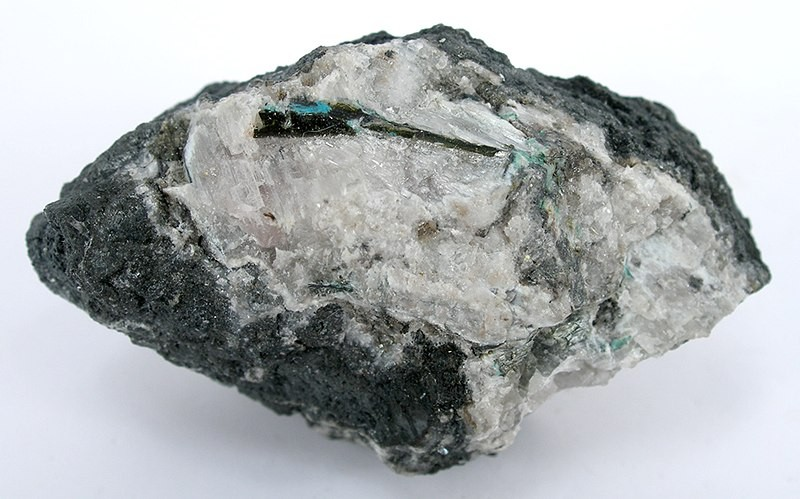
- Chloroxiphite crystal (dark green) embedded in mendipite. The bright blue material is diaboleite.

General
- Category: Halide mineral
- Formula: Pb_{3}CuO_{2}Cl_{2}(OH)_{2}
- IMA symbol: Cxp
- Strunz classification: 3.DB.30
- Crystal system: Monoclinic
- Crystal class: Prismatic (2/m) (same H-M symbol)
- Space group: P2_{1}/m
- Unit cell: a = 6.6972(8) Å, b = 5.7538(5) Å, c = 10.4686(14) Å; β = 97.747(10)°; Z = 2

Identification
- Color: Dull olive green to pistachio-green
- Crystal habit: Elongated, flatenned, striated and often curved crystals and groups
- Cleavage: Perfect on {1̅01}, distinct on {100}
- Tenacity: Very brittle, friable
- Mohs scale hardness: 2 1/2
- Luster: Adamantine, resinous
- Streak: Light green yellow
- Diaphaneity: Transparent
- Specific gravity: 6.76–6.93
- Optical properties: Biaxial (−)
- Refractive index: n_{α} = 2.160 n_{β} = 2.240 n_{γ} = 2.250
- Birefringence: δ = 0.090
- Pleochroism: Visible: Y = yellowish brown; Z = bright emerald-green
- 2V angle: Measured: ~70°

Chloroxiphite is a rare olive green to pistachio green lead copper halide mineral with formula: Pb_{3}CuO_{2}Cl_{2}(OH)_{2}.

It was first discovered in 1923 in the Mendip Hills, Somerset, England associated with mendipite. Like mendipite it is an oxychloride mineral and formed from the alteration of lead ore (galena) by secondary oxidation. In addition to mendipite, it occurs with diaboleite, parkinsonite, wulfenite, cerussite and hydrocerussite. Its name comes from the Greek words (χλωρός) "green", describing its color, and (ζιφος) "blade" as its crystal form is long blade-like crystals that often show the growth pattern and time taken to form.
