= Zhangpeishanite =

Halide mineral

General
- Category: Minerals
- Formula: BaFCl
- IMA symbol: Zph
- Strunz classification: 3.DC.25
- Dana classification: 9.2.11.3
- Crystal system: Tetragonal
- Crystal class: Ditetragonal Dipyramidal; H-M symbol: 4/mmm (4/m 2/m 2/m)
- Unit cell: 111.00

Identification
- Color: Colorless
- Twinning: P4/nmm
- Cleavage: Perfect on {001}
- Mohs scale hardness: 2.5
- Luster: Vitreous
- Streak: White
- Diaphaneity: Transparent
- Specific gravity: 4.54
- Density: 4.54
- Optical properties: Uniaxial (-)
- Refractive index: n_{ω} = 1.656(2) n_{ε} = 1.652(2)
- Birefringence: 0.004
- Ultraviolet fluorescence: None
- Solubility: Soluble in water

Zhangpeishanite is a mineral named after Zhang Peishan (Chinese: 张培善), a Chinese mineralogist at the Institute of Geology of the Chinese Academy of Sciences, in recognition of his contributions to studying the mineralogy Bayan Obo deposit, where the mineral is mined. The Bayan Obo deposit is also known for being a world class deposit. The mineral got approved by the IMA in 2006 but was published two years after its approval. The mineral consists of barium chloride fluoride.

== Properties ==
Some of the data collected about zhangpeishanite were carried out on a synthetic equivalent of the mineral, such as cleavage and refractive index, due to zhangpeishanite's minute grain size. The mineral is isostructural with matlockite. It is a member of the matlockite group, and it is the barium dominant analogue of rorisite and matlockite. It is associated with barite, hematite, norsethite and fluorite. The inclusions form as bands within fluorite. The mineral occurs in fluorite as inclusions, up to 100 μm. However, they are typically much smaller, about 50 μm. It consists of barium mostly (71.21%), chlorine (18.94%) and fluorine (9.85%). Singular crystals can be obtained at 1500 K by solid-state reaction between BaF_{2} and BaCl_{2}.
