= Laurionite =

Lead halide mineral

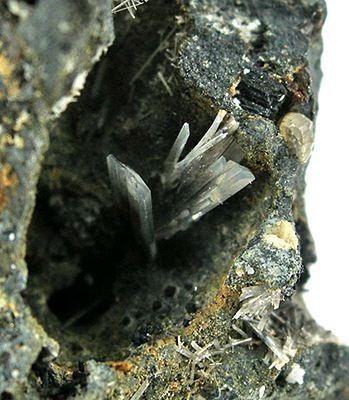
- Laurionite crystals in a vug from the Laurium district of Greece

General
- Category: Halide minerals
- Formula: PbCl(OH)
- IMA symbol: Lri
- Strunz classification: 3.DC.05
- Crystal system: Orthorhombic
- Crystal class: Dipyramidal (mmm); H-M symbol: (2/m 2/m 2/m)
- Space group: Pnma
- Unit cell: a = 7.111, b = 9.6987 c = 4.0203 [Å]; Z = 4

Identification
- Color: Colorless, white
- Crystal habit: Elongated tabular prismatic crystals
- Cleavage: Distinct on {101}
- Tenacity: Flexible
- Mohs scale hardness: 3–3.5
- Luster: Adamantine, pearly
- Streak: White
- Diaphaneity: Transparent
- Specific gravity: 6.241
- Optical properties: Biaxial (−)
- Refractive index: n_{α} = 2.077 n_{β} = 2.116 n_{γ} = 2.158
- Birefringence: δ = 0.081
- 2V angle: Measured: 70°
- Solubility: Sleight in cold water

Laurionite (PbCl(OH)) is a lead halide mineral. It forms colorless to white crystals in the orthorhombic crystal system and is dimorphous with paralaurionite, both members of the matlockite group.

It was first described in 1887 for an occurrence in the Laurium District, Attica, Greece, and named after the town Laurium. It occurs as an oxidation product in lead ore deposits, and is also produced on lead-bearing slag by reaction with saline solutions. It occurs associated with paralaurionite, penfieldite, fiedlerite, phosgenite, cerussite and anglesite.
