= Bolehill, Derbyshire =

Area of Wirksworth, Derbyshire, England

Coordinates: 53.092°N 1.568°W

Bolehill
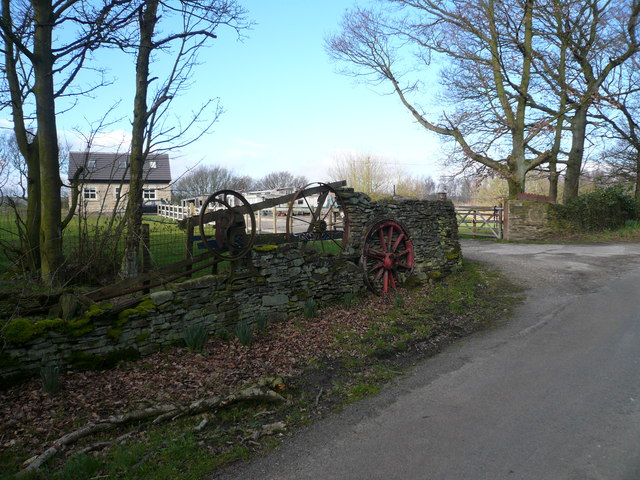

- Location within Derbyshire
- OS grid reference: SK290550
- Civil parish: Wirksworth
- District: Derbyshire Dales
- Shire county: Derbyshire
- Region: East Midlands
- Country: England
- Sovereign state: United Kingdom
- Post town: MATLOCK
- Postcode district: DE4
- Police: Derbyshire
- Fire: Derbyshire
- Ambulance: East Midlands

Bolehill is an area of Wirksworth, in the Derbyshire Dales district, in the county of Derbyshire, England. It is located in the north of the town and has connections to the lead mining. Bolehill is adjacent to Black Rocks, a local landmark and a short walk from the High Peak Trail at Middleton incline.

== History ==
Bolehill has a history as a mining and small-holding settlement, one of the very few mining villages to spring up during the 18th and 19th centuries in the Peak District.

By the 1841 census there were 637 inhabitants living in the village, 77 out of 209 workers being employed in lead mining. Bagshaw’s directory of 1848 calls the Bage “the most productive mine in the District”. 17th and 18th century references to Bage Mine, Wall Close Mine (to the North) and Hollyhole Grove Mine (to the West) can be found among the Wooley Manuscripts.

== Bage Mine ==
Bage Mine (SSSI) is well known to most geologists, as it is the only British source of Cromfordite and Matlockite. Both extremely rare secondary lead minerals. The minerals are complex chlorides. Mine site is near an air shaft over 120 years ago.

- Matlockite: PbFCl a lead fluorochloride, this crystal in a matrix of galena is exceptionally rare.
- Phosgenite: Pb_{2}CO_{3}Cl_{2} (Cromfordite).

Mid-19th century lead production in Wirksworth reached a peak in 1859 and thereafter declined steeply. Employment in mining dropped from 395 in 1851 to 27 in 1894. Bage Mine was one of the last to remain productive, yielding over half of the Wirksworth production in 1879 and being, with Golconda, the only substantial Wirksworth mine in 1893. By 1900 no mine in the vicinity was producing over 10 tons of ore per annum.

== Smelting the ore ==
What may have been the Bolehill Bole, a medieval smelting hearth, was close to SK 298542, some 300-350 yards South East of Little Bolehill.

== Working in the village ==
In 1846 there was a brickmaker, a firm of stonemasons, two hosiers (clothing suppliers), two boot and shoe makers, a maltster, six farmers, and a number of shopkeepers. Later, there was a Co-op on New Road and a post office on Little Bolehill. The primitive Methodist Chapel was rebuilt in 1852 from a smaller building marked on the 1848, but not on the 1806, map. Until quite recently the Women’s Institute building (a large wooden building in the centre of the village) had been continually used since the 1940s. The Men’s Institute is still in operation and has been in existence since the 19th century.

== Inns ==
By the late 19th century Bolehill had four Inns, the Railway, the Holly Bush, New Inn and Miner’s Standard, the latter remaining in service until the late 1980s.

== Cromford High Peak Railway ==
The line originally built in 1830, was one of the earliest railways in the country, it had 9 inclines where the trucks were hauled up or down the incline by stationary engines. A siding and "goods wharf" ran from the line into the brickworks at Bolehill, which was on the east side of Cromford Road near Steeple House.

The village of Bolehill was built on the gritstone side of the valley rather than the more stable limestone side. This is because the water supply, which flows down from Cromford Moor, simply disappears as soon as it reaches Cromford Road and the porous limestone.
