= Lead fluorochloride =

Names
- Other names Lead fluoride chloride, lead fluoro-chloride

Identifiers
3D model (JSmol)	Interactive image
PubChem CID	101611508
CompTox Dashboard (EPA)	DTXSID001047857
- InChI: InChI=1S/ClH.FH.Pb/h2*1H;/q;;+2/p-2 Key: FVEZKDUIAKYNFW-UHFFFAOYSA-L
- SMILES: [F-].[Cl-].[Pb+2]

Properties
Chemical formula	PbFCl
Appearance	colorless crystals
Density	7.11 g/cm^{3}
Melting point	603 °C (1,117 °F; 876 K)

Structure
Crystal structure	tetragonal
Space group	P4/nmm

Related compounds
Related compounds	Barium fluorochloride; Strontium fluorochloride; Lead fluorobromide
- Except where otherwise noted, data are given for materials in their standard state (at 25 °C [77 °F], 100 kPa). Infobox references

Lead fluorochloride or lead fluoride chloride is an inorganic compound of lead, fluorine, and chlorine with the chemical formula PbFCl. The compound contains both fluoride and chloride ions, i.e. it is a mixed halide.

== Natural occurrences ==
The mineral matlockite with the chemical formula PbFCl was discovered in the early 1800s at Bage Mine in Bolehill near Matlock, alongside phosgenite and anglesite specimens. While phosgenite had already been identified by that time, it appears that matlockite was not officially recognized as a distinct new mineral for approximately 50 years after its discovery.

== Synthesis ==
The compound can be obtained by melting PbF_{2} with PbCl_{2} while other methods are also known.

PbF_{2} + PbCl_{2} → 2PbFCl

An exchange reaction of acidified solutions of lead nitrate, potassium chloride, and potassium fluoride:

Pb(NO_{3})_{2} + KF + KCl → PbClF + 2KNO_{3}

== Physical properties ==
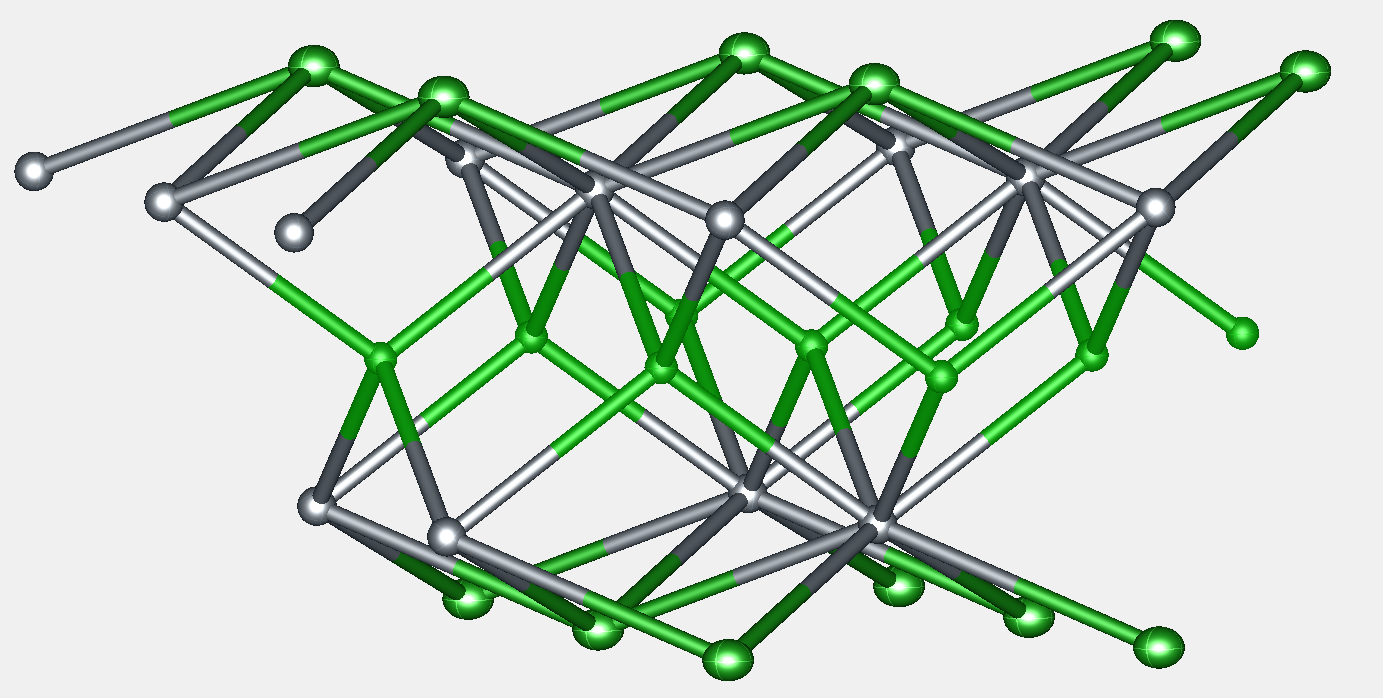
Subunit of solid PbFCl, showing the atomic structure as determined by X-ray crystallography. The larger green spheres are chloride, the tetrahedrally-bonded smaller green spheres represent fluoride.

The compound crystallizes in the tetragonal system, space group P4/mmm. Unit cell dimensions are a = 4.111 Å, c = 7.226 Å, V = 122.1 Å^{3}. It adopts a layered structure.

Pure lead fluorochloride is transparent between 270 and 800 nm. It is fluorescent under UV light.
