= Penfieldite =

Rare lead hydroxychloride mineral

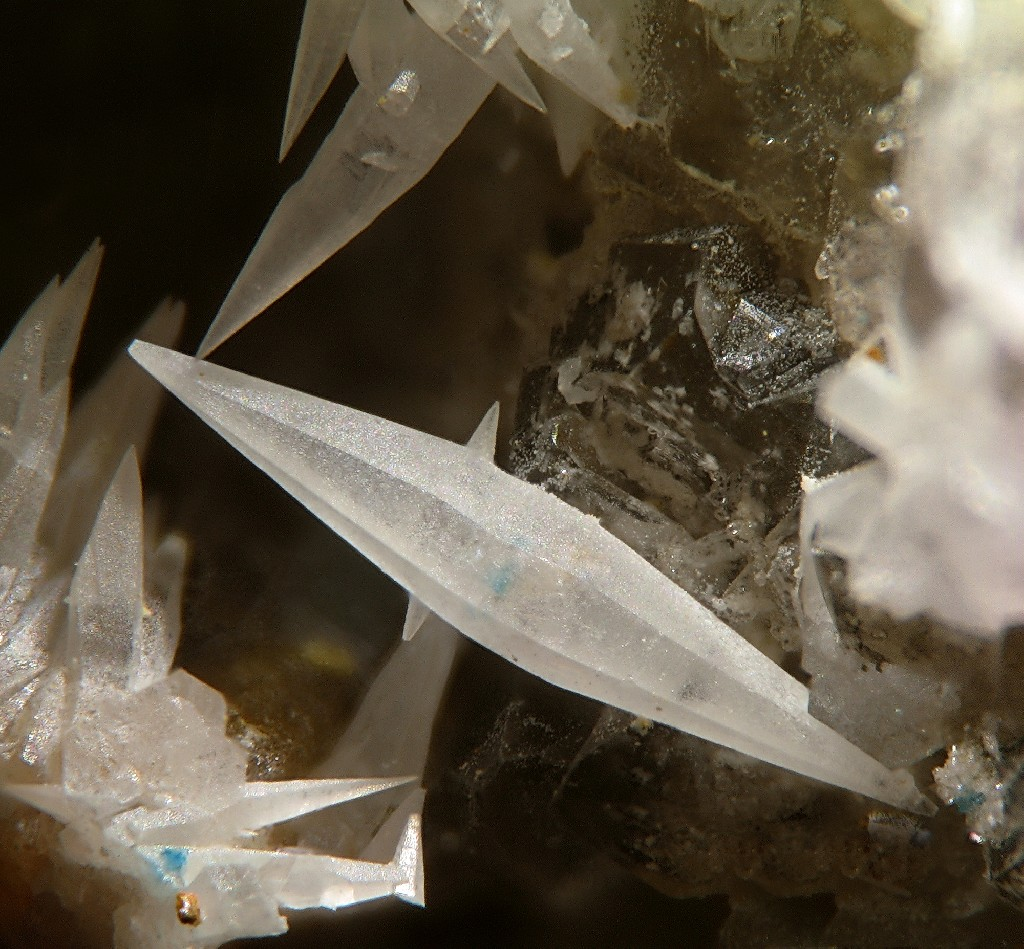
- Penfieldite.Margarita Mine, Caracoles, Sierra Gorda District, Tocopilla Province, Antofagasta Region, Chile formula=Pb_{2}Cl_{3}(OH)

General
- Category: Minerals
- IMA symbol: Pfd
- Strunz classification: 03.DC.15
- Dana classification: 10.04.01.01
- Crystal system: Hexagonal
- Crystal class: Trigonal Dipyramidal; H-M symbol: 6̅
- Space group: P6̅
- Unit cell: 5,360.83

Identification
- Formula mass: 537.77
- Color: Colorless, white, yellowish, bluish
- Cleavage: Distinct/good on {0001}
- Mohs scale hardness: 3–4
- Luster: Adamantine, greasy
- Streak: White
- Diaphaneity: Transparent
- Specific gravity: 6.00
- Density: Measured: 5.82 – 6.61; Calculated: 6.00
- Optical properties: Uniaxial (+)
- Refractive index: n_{ω} = 2.130(1) n_{ε} = 2.210(1)
- Birefringence: 0.080
- Solubility: Soluble in water

Penfieldite is a rare lead hydroxychloride mineral from the class of halides. It was named after Samuel Lewis Penfield. It has been a valid species before the founding of IMA, and was first published in 1892. It had been grandfathered, meaning the name penfieldite is still believed to refer to a valid species. When it was first described by Genth in 1892 from Laurion, Greece, the mineral had the formula of Pb_{3}Cl_{4}O.

== Properties ==
Penfieldite grows tabular pyramidal crystals, meaning it is longer instead of being wide, and grows in the shape of a pyramid. It is a secondary mineral, meaning that rock minerals went under transformation due to changes in pressure and temperature, and penfieldite is the newly formed stable mineral after this transformation. Singular crystals are usually striped, and can grow up to 3 cm. Pure penfieldite is colorless, however, due to lattice defects or foreign admixtures, it can be white, yellow or even blue. It mainly consists of lead (77.06%) and chlorine (19.78%), and has a negligible amount of oxygen (2.98%) and hydrogen (0.19%) in it. It does not show any radioactive properties whatsoever. After it is dissolved in water, penfieldite leaves a lead oxychloride residue behind that is yellowish white in color. When heated to 180 °C, a 9c periodicity can be observed, meaning the crystal repeats itself every nine layers in the c crystallographic direction. When further heated to 200 °C and above, the crystals are quickly destroyed.

== Classification ==
In both the 8th and the 9th edition of the Strunz Mineralogical tables, penfieldite is classified as belonging to the oxyhalides (and related to double halides). However, the new Strunz mineral classification now subdivides it more precisely, according to the cations involved in the formula, and the mineral is accordingly in the subsection "With Pb (As, Sb, Bi), without Cu". The Dana classification also assigns penfieldite to the oxyhalides, but classifies it according to chemical composition in the subdivision "Oxihalides and hydroxyhalides with the formula A2(O,OH)Xq".

== Occurrences and localities ==
Penfieldite has been found in around twenty localities, as Laurium, Greece, Baratti Beach, Italy, Mazarrón Port, Spain, and at the Margarita Mine, Chile. It is a secondary mineral formed due to sea water contact and smelting activities. It is the alteration product of a lead-bearing slag contacting seawater in Greece and Italy, and in Chile, it can be found in an oxidized hydrothermal lead deposit. Specimens found in Greece were associated with phosgenite and paralaurionite, while the Italian specimens were found in association with cotunnite and fiedlerite.
