= Cumengeite =

Halide mineral

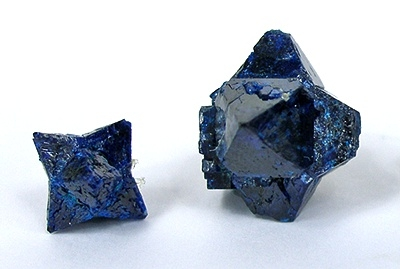

General
- Category: Minerals
- Formula: Pb_{21}Cu_{20}Cl_{42}(OH)_{40} · 6H_{2}O
- IMA symbol: Cge
- Strunz classification: 3.DB.20
- Dana classification: 10.6.7.1
- Crystal system: Tetragonal
- Crystal class: Ditetragonal Dipyramidal; H-M Symbol: 4/mmm (4/m 2/m 2/m)
- Space group: I4/mmm
- Unit cell: 5,545.85

Identification
- Color: Indigo blue
- Cleavage: Good on {101} Distinct on {110} Poor on {001}
- Mohs scale hardness: 2.5
- Luster: Sub-vitreous
- Streak: Sky-blue
- Diaphaneity: Translucent
- Specific gravity: 4.656
- Density: Measured: 4.656; Calculated: 4.66
- Optical properties: Uniaxial (−)
- Refractive index: n_{ω} = 2.026 – 2.041 n_{ε} = 1.926 – 1.965
- Birefringence: 0.100
- Pleochroism: Visible
- Solubility: Soluble in HNO_{3}

Cumengeite, also known as cumengite, is a secondary mineral that was named after mining engineer Bernard Louis Philippe Édouard Cumenge, who found the first specimens. It is easily confused with diaboleite. It is a valid species that was first described prior to 1959, and is grandfathered now, but it has been a valid species since 1893, since pre-IMA. It is the hydroxychloride of lead and copper.

== Properties ==
It is brittle and conchoidal, meaning it is easily breakable, and the fracture of it makes small, conchoidal fragments. It is an epitaxial mineral, which is a form of crystal growth. During the growth, the new crystalline layers are formed with at least one well-defined orientation. The crystal itself is pseudo-cubic, meaning its shape resembles that of a cube. When this uncommon mineral forms epitaxial overgrowths with boleite however, where the inner cubic core is boleite, and the outer protruding mineral which forms in triangular shape is cumengeite, the two mineral form a shape similar to a star. It has octahedral, "diamond-shaped" or cubo-octahedral crystals. It usually appears on the faces of boleite or pseudoboleite, as an intergrowth. It has dichroic attributes, which in this case means the mineral breaks up the light into different beams of different wavelengths, making the light passing through them break and come out in different colors. Cumengeite is soluble in HNO_{3}. It mostly consists of lead (55.08%), chlorine (18.85%) and copper (16.09%), but otherwise it has oxygen (9.32%) and hydrogen (0.66%) in it.

== Mining ==
Although it has several localities, the most significant one, where it is a type locality is at the Boleo district, specifically at the Amelia mine in Mexico. Til these days, that mine is the only one that had produced well-formed cumengeite crystals of any significance. Cumenge, the one who found the mineral also collected it from its type locality, Boleo. It appears in lead or copper deposits' secondary, oxidized zone. The mineral's smelter slag is immersed into the sea water, however this is an anthropogenic material and not a natural mineral. This sedimentary mineral is a rare collectors mineral, high-quality epitaxial specimens are really valuable.
