= Lead fluorobromide =

Chemical compound

Names
- Other names Lead fluoride bromide, lead fluoro-bromide

Identifiers
3D model (JSmol)	Interactive image
PubChem CID	139036563
- InChI: InChI=1S/BrH.FH.Pb/h2*1H;/q;;+2/p-2 Key: CHZCHVXLHSTGAJ-UHFFFAOYSA-L
- SMILES: [Br-].[F-].[Pb+2]

Properties
Chemical formula	PbFBr
Appearance	colourless crystals
Density	7.52
Solubility in water	insoluble

Structure
Crystal structure	tetragonal
Space group	P4/mmm

Related compounds
Related compounds	Lead fluorochloride
- Except where otherwise noted, data are given for materials in their standard state (at 25 °C [77 °F], 100 kPa). Infobox references

Lead fluorobromide or lead fluoride bromide is an inorganic compound of lead, fluorine, and bromine with the chemical formula PbFBr. The compound is a mixed halide of lead, meaning it contains both fluoride and bromide ions.

== Synthesis ==
The compound can be obtained by melting PbF_{2} with PbBr_{2} while other methods are also known.

PbF_{2} + PbBr_{2} → 2PbFBr

== Physical properties ==
The compound forms crystals of layered tetragonal system, space group P4/mmm. The unit cell has dimensions a = 4.18 Å, c = 7.59 Å, and Z = 2.
