= Mendipite =

Oxyhalide of lead. Rare mineral found in the Mendip Hills

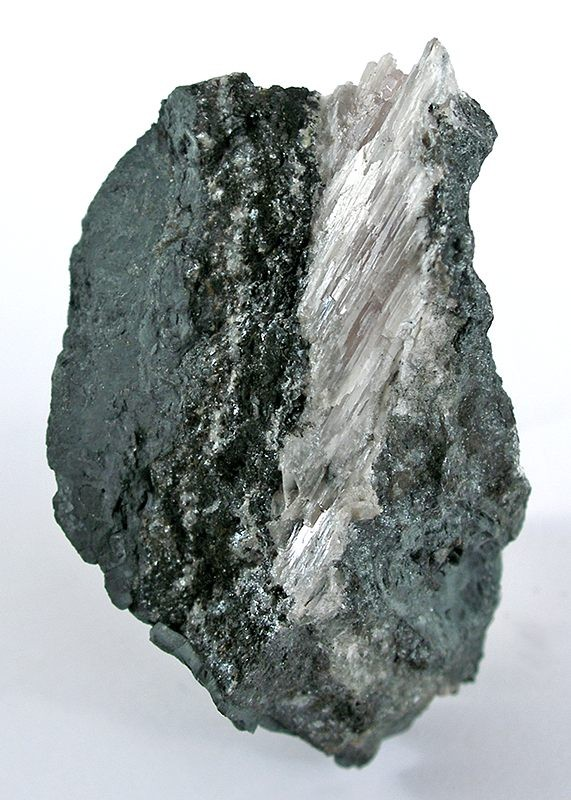

General
- Category: Halide mineral
- Formula: Pb_{3}Cl_{2}O_{2}
- IMA symbol: Mdi
- Strunz classification: 3.DC.70 Oxyhalide
- Dana classification: 10.3.1.1
- Crystal system: Orthorhombic
- Crystal class: Dipyramidal (mmm); H-M symbol: (2/m 2/m 2/m)
- Space group: Pnma or P2_{1}2_{1}2_{1},
- Unit cell: a = 9.52 Å, b = 11.87 Å, c = 5.87 Å; Z = 4

Identification
- Formula mass: 724.50 g/mol
- Color: Colorless to white, brownish cream, grey, yellowish, pink, red, or blue; nearly colorless in transmitted light.
- Crystal habit: Columnar or fibrous aggregates, often radiated, and cleavable masses.
- Cleavage: Perfect on {110}, fair on {100} and {010}
- Fracture: Conchoidal to uneven
- Mohs scale hardness: 2 1/2 to 3
- Luster: Pearly to silky on cleavages; resinous to adamantine on fractures.
- Streak: White
- Diaphaneity: Translucent, rarely transparent
- Specific gravity: 7.24
- Optical properties: Biaxial (+)
- Refractive index: n_{α} = 2.240, n_{β} = 2.270, n_{γ} = 2.310
- Birefringence: δ = 0.070
- 2V angle: Measured: 90°, calculated: 84°
- Solubility: Soluble in dilute nitric acid, HNO_{3}

Mendipite is a rare mineral that was named for the locality where it is found, the Mendip Hills in Somerset, England. It is an oxyhalide of lead with formula Pb_{3}Cl_{2}O_{2}.

== Crystal structure ==
Most references assert that mendipite crystallises in the orthorhombic crystal system, disphenoidal class 2 2 2, meaning that it has three mutually perpendicular axes of twofold symmetry, with space group P2_{1}2_{1}2_{1}, meaning that each of these axes is a screw axis. One reference, however, gives the crystal class as orthorhombic m m m with space group Pnma, which has a higher symmetry. In each case the "P" means that the mineral has a primitive unit cell.

Unit cell parameters:

- a = 9.52 Å, b = 11.87 Å, c = 5.87 Å, Z = 4
- a = 11.87 Å, b = 5.806 Å, c = 9.48 Å, Z = 4

== Optical properties ==
Mendipite is colorless to white, brownish cream, grey, yellowish, pink, red, or blue. It is nearly colorless in transmitted light. It has a white streak and its luster is pearly to silky on cleavages, and resinous to adamantine on fractures. The mineral is translucent, and rarely transparent. It is biaxial (+), with refractive indices N_{x} = 2.24, N_{y} = 2.27, N_{z} = 2.31. These values are quite high, compared with ordinary glass at 1.5. This is typical of lead minerals.

== Physical properties ==
Mendipite is found in columnar or fibrous aggregates, often radiated but more rarely straight long fibers, and in cleavable masses. The cleavage is perfect on {110} and fair on {100} and {010}. Fracture is conchoidal (shell-like) to uneven and the mineral is soft, with hardness only 2 1/2 to 3, a bit less than that of calcite. Because of the lead content the specific gravity is high, at 7.24, or 7 to 7.2, just a little less than that of mimetite, another lead mineral. Mendipite is soluble in dilute nitric acid, HNO_{3}. It is not radioactive.

== Environment ==
At the Eleura Mine near Cobar, New South Wales, Australia, oxygenated groundwater reacted with sulfide minerals during the Cenozoic, forming supergene sulfides, as well as the sulfate minerals beudantite, anglesite and baryte, together with some mimetite and native silver. Cerussite crystallised later, and later still chloride-rich groundwaters reacted with many of these earlier minerals to form more mimetite, as well as blixite, laurionite, mendipite and chlorargyrite.

At the type locality, galena was deposited in Carboniferous Limestone throughout the Mendip Hills during the late Permian or Triassic Period. In the Jurassic Period that followed, these deposits were exposed to the action of seawater, which deposited manganate minerals that reacted with the galena and adsorbed heavy metals both from the seawater and surroundings. A later event heated the deposits creating the conditions which led to the formation of the suite of unusual secondary minerals, including a number of rare oxohalide minerals, now found at Merehead. The mendipite occurs in nodules in manganese oxide ores, associated with hydrocerussite, cerussite, malachite, pyromorphite, calcite, chloroxiphite, diaboleite and parkinsonite.

== Type locality ==
The type locality is Churchill, Mendip Hills, Somerset, England, and type material is conserved at the Royal Swedish Academy of Sciences, Stockholm, Sweden. Other localities include Australia, Germany, Greece, Sweden, the UK and the US.
