= Diaboleite =

Blue-colored mineral

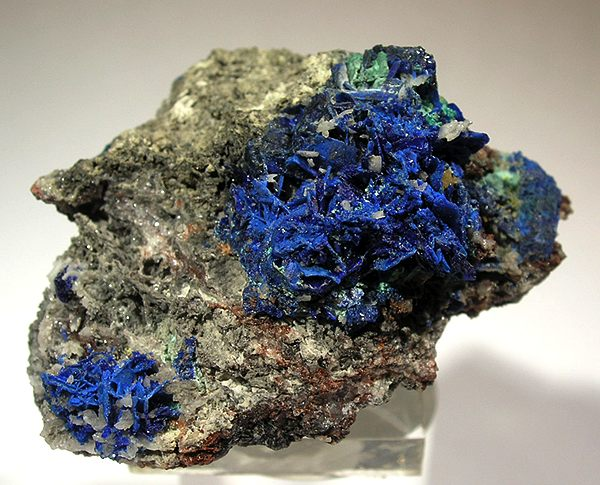

General
- Category: Halide mineral
- Formula: Pb_{2}CuCl_{2}(OH)_{4}
- IMA symbol: Dbol
- Strunz classification: 3.DB.05
- Dana classification: 10.6.1.1
- Crystal system: Tetragonal
- Crystal class: Ditetragonal pyramidal (4mm); H-M symbol: (4mm)
- Space group: P4mm
- Unit cell: a = 5.880, c = 5.500 Å, Z = 1

Identification
- Color: Blue
- Crystal habit: As square tabular crystals, thin plates, massive
- Cleavage: Perfect on {001}
- Fracture: Conchoidal
- Tenacity: Brittle
- Mohs scale hardness: 2.5
- Luster: Adamantine, pearly on cleavages
- Streak: Pale blue
- Diaphaneity: Transparent to translucent
- Density: 5.41 to 5.43 g/cm^{3}
- Optical properties: Uniaxial (−)
- Refractive index: n_{ω} = 1.980, n_{ε} = 1.850
- Birefringence: δ = 0.130
- Absorption spectra: O > E, in thick fragments
- Solubility: Completely soluble in nitric acid

Diaboleite is a blue-colored mineral with formula Pb_{2}CuCl_{2}(OH)_{4}. It was discovered in England in 1923 and named diaboleite, from the Greek word διά and boleite, meaning "distinct from boleite". The mineral has since been found in a number of countries.

== Description ==
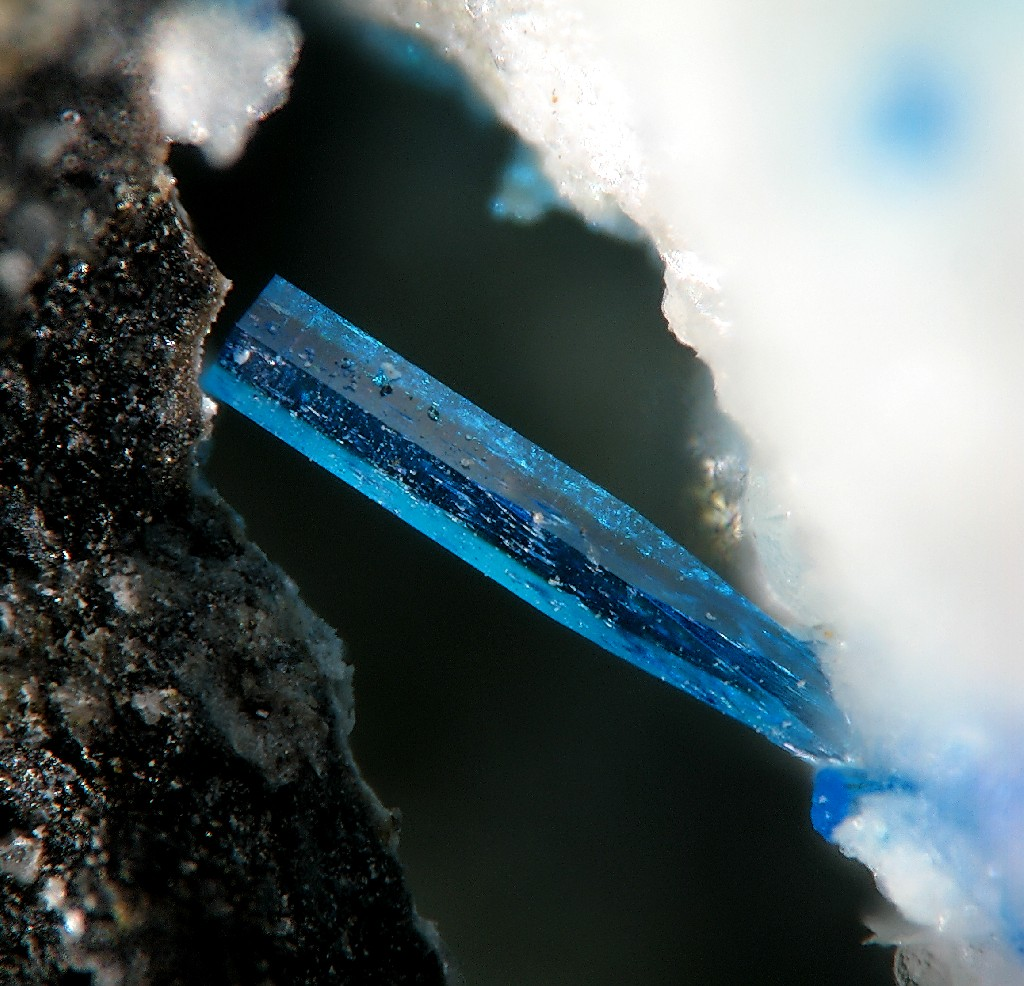
Diaboleite crystal from a slag occurrence in the Laurium District, Attica, Greece (size: less than 1 mm)

Diaboleite is deep blue in color and pale blue in transmitted light. The mineral occurs as tabular crystals up to 2 cm (0.8 in) in size, as subparallel aggregates, or it has massive habit. Vicinal forms of the tabular crystals have a square or octagonal outline and rarely exhibit pyramidal hemihedralism.

== Formation ==
Diaboleite occurs in manganese oxide ores, as a secondary mineral in lead and copper oxide ores, and in seawater-exposed slag. Diaboleite has been found in association with atacamite, boleite, caledonite, cerussite, chloroxiphite, hydrocerussite, leadhillite, mendipite, paratacamite, phosgenite, and wherryite.

A study in 1986 synthesized diaboleite crystals up to 0.18 mm (0.0071 in) in size using two different methods. The study demonstrated that diaboleite is a low-temperature phase, that is stable under hydrothermal conditions at temperatures less than 100 to 170 °C (212 to 338 °F). At higher temperatures, the first stable mineral to form is cumengeite.

== History ==
In 1923, diaboleite was discovered at Higher Pitts Mine in the Mendip Hills of Somerset, England, and described by L. J. Spencer and E.D. Mountain. The study of the similar mineral boleite was perplexing at the time and this new mineral only compounded the difficulty. As insufficient material was available for a full investigation, Spencer and Mountain named it diaboleite, meaning "distinct from boleite", out of "desperation".

The mineral was grandfathered as a valid mineral by the International Mineralogical Association as it was described prior to 1959.

== Distribution ==
As of 2012, diaboleite has been found in Australia, Austria, Chile, France, Germany, Greece, Iran, Italy, Russia, South Africa, the UK and the US. The type material is held at the Natural History Museum in London and the National Museum of Natural History in Washington, D.C.
