= Tiger, Arizona =

Former populated place in Pinal County, Arizona

- A former populated place
- Location within Arizona
- Coordinates: 32°42′28″N 110°40′56″W
- Country: United States
- State: Arizona
- County: Pinal
- Founded: 1881
- Abandoned: 1954
- Named for: Princeton Tigers
- Elevation: 3,081 ft (939 m)

Population (2009)
  - Total: 0
- Time zone: UTC-7 (MST (no DST))
- Opened: July 12, 1894
- Closed: May 1, 1902
- Opened: March 15, 1939
- Closed: November 26, 1954

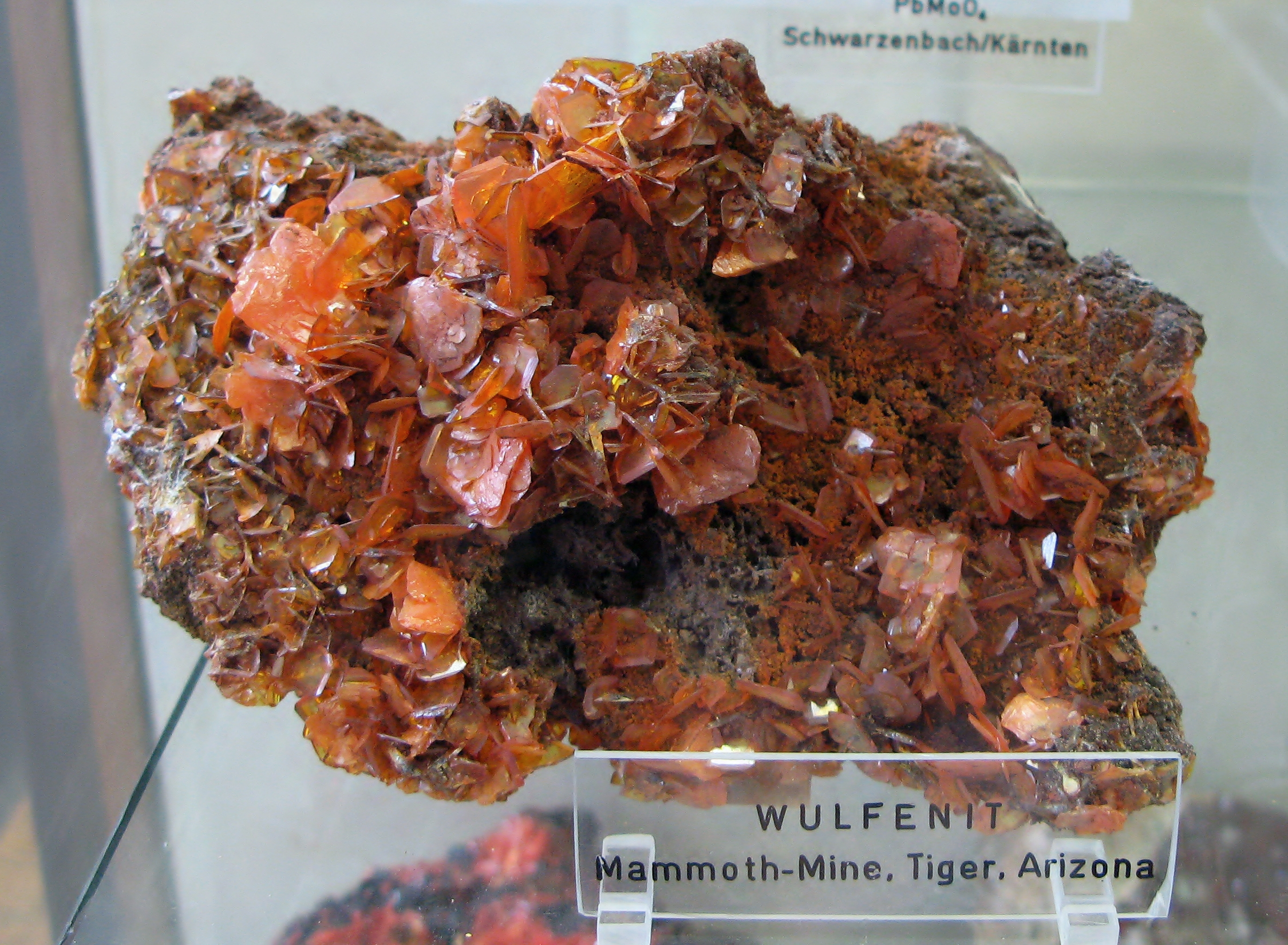
Wulfenite specimen from the old Mammoth Mine, Tiger, Arizona

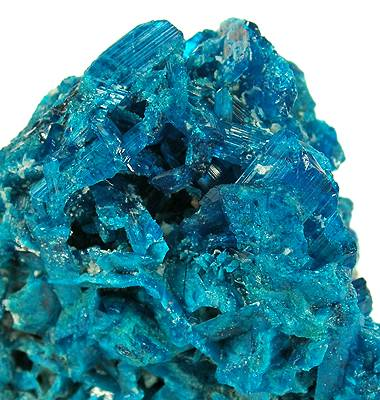
Caledonite (light blue) - Diaboleite (dark blue) specimen, Mammoth-St. Anthony. Details at Commons.

Tiger is a former populated place in Pinal County in the U.S. state of Arizona. The town was settled as Schultz circa 1881 in what was then the Arizona Territory, then later reestablished as Tiger after World War I.

== History ==
The area that was to become Tiger was first settled in 1881 after Frank Schultz located gold ore in what was to become the Mammoth Mine. The camp that settled around the mine took the name Schultz, and a post office was established under that name on July 12, 1894.

Since water, needed for refinement of ore, was not present near the mine, a mill was established 4 miles (6.4 km) away on the west bank of the San Pedro River, in a town that came to be known as Mammoth, after the mine and the mill. The ore was hauled to the mill by way of mule teams, until just after the start of the 20th century when an aerial tram was completed between the Mammoth Mine and the Mammoth Mill. As the tram's construction neared completion, and the need for the town waned, the Schultz post office was closed on May 1, 1902.

The mines reopened in 1915 due to World War I's increased demand for the molybdenum and vanadium found in the area. When the war was over, the prices fell, and the mines closed again in 1919. Shortly thereafter, the Mammoth Mine property was purchased by Sam Houghton, who renamed both the mine and the town after his college mascot, the Princeton Tiger. When the price of gold increased in 1933, the town again grew in prosperity, and the new Tiger post office opened on March 1, 1939. It was as Tiger that the town reached its peak in the early 1950s. Soon after, the local mines, as well as the town of Tiger, had run their course, and the post office was discontinued on November 26, 1954.

== Remnants ==
After the San Manuel Copper Company acquired the land, they demolished all remaining structures in order to mine the silica on site for its gold content and as flux material for the San Manuel Smelter. However, the material contained too much lead, and the plan proved fruitless. As such, nothing is left of the town of Tiger today, but the filled-in shaft of the Mammoth mine in the middle of town.

== Mining ==
The Tiger or Mammoth mine is a famous mineral locality, especially for matlockite and wulfenite. In addition, the mineral yedlinite is a hydrated oxychloride of lead and chromium found only at Tiger, and first noted on preexisting specimens in 1967.

The various mines at Mammoth and Tiger had combined recorded production of around:

- 400,000 oz gold
- 1,000,000 oz silver
- 3.5 million lbs copper
- 75 million lbs lead
- 50 million lbs zinc
- 6 million lbs of molybdenum
- 2.5 million lbs of vanadium

At 1991 prices, this would be worth about $300 million.

== Geography ==
Historical population
Census	Pop.	Note	%±
1940	500		—
1950	783		56.6%
1960	0		−100.0%

The site is located approximately 4 miles (6.4 km) west of the town of Mammoth at 32°42′28″N 110°40′56″W (32.7078463, -110.6823227), at an elevation of 3,081 feet (939 m). The Mammoth Mine (later the Tiger Mine) is located at 32°42′23″N 110°41′05″W.

== Demographics ==
US Census data places the population of the town at 500 in 1940 after its re-founding as Tiger, and 783 in 1950. It was after this final census that the town is said to have reached its peak population of approximately 1,800 residents, before heading into permanent decline and abandonment.

== See also ==
- American Old West
- Boomtown
- History of Arizona
- List of ghost towns in Arizona
