= White lead =

Names
- Other names Basic lead carbonate

Identifiers
CAS Number	1319-46-6
3D model (JSmol)	Interactive image
ChemSpider	14148
ECHA InfoCard	100.013.901
EC Number	215-290-6
PubChem CID	14834
UNII	WDF96425HV
CompTox Dashboard (EPA)	DTXSID9029641
- InChI: InChI=1S/2CH2O3.2H2O.3Pb/c2*2-1(3)4;;;;;/h2*(H2,2,3,4);2*1H2;;;/q;;;;3*+2/p-6 Key: RYZCLUQMCYZBJQ-UHFFFAOYSA-H
- SMILES: C(=O)([O-])[O-].C(=O)([O-])[O-].[OH-].[OH-].[Pb+2].[Pb+2].[Pb+2]

Properties
Chemical formula	2PbCO_{3}·Pb(OH)_{2}
Molar mass	775.633 g/mol
Appearance	White powder

Hazards
- Occupational safety and health (OHS/OSH)
Main hazards	Lead poisoning
- GHS labelling
Pictograms	(GHS07: Exclamation mark) (GHS08: Health hazard) (GHS09: Environmental hazard)
Hazard statements	H302, H332, H360, H373, H410
Precautionary statements	P201, P202, P260, P264, P270, P271, P273, P281, P301+P312, P304+P312, P304+P340, P308+P313, P312, P314, P330, P391, P405, P501
- Except where otherwise noted, data are given for materials in their standard state (at 25 °C [77 °F], 100 kPa). verify (what is ?) Infobox references

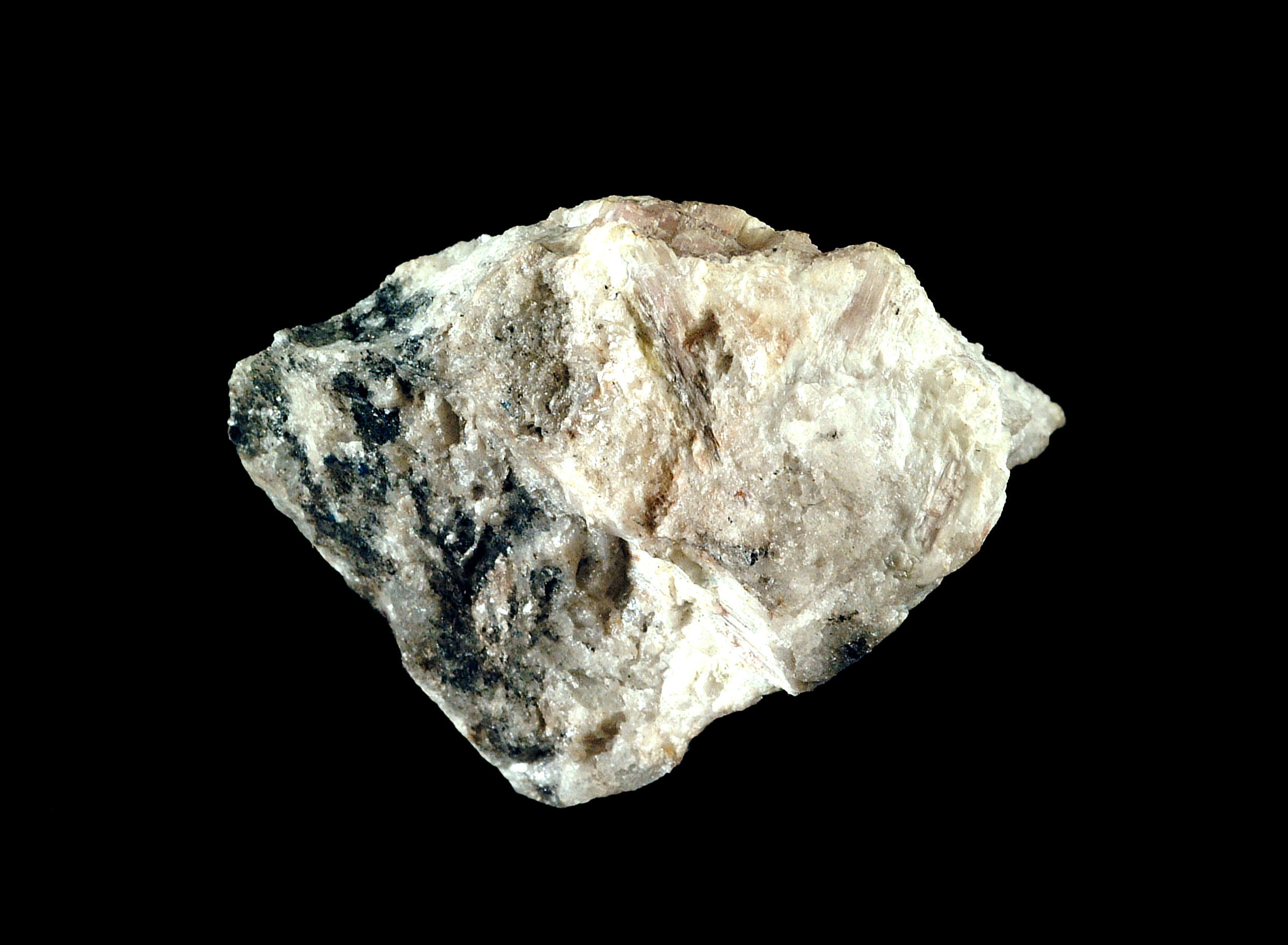
Sample of hydrocerussite (dark crystals), the natural mineral form of white lead, with mendipite (light crystals) from England (size: about 3.5 cm across)

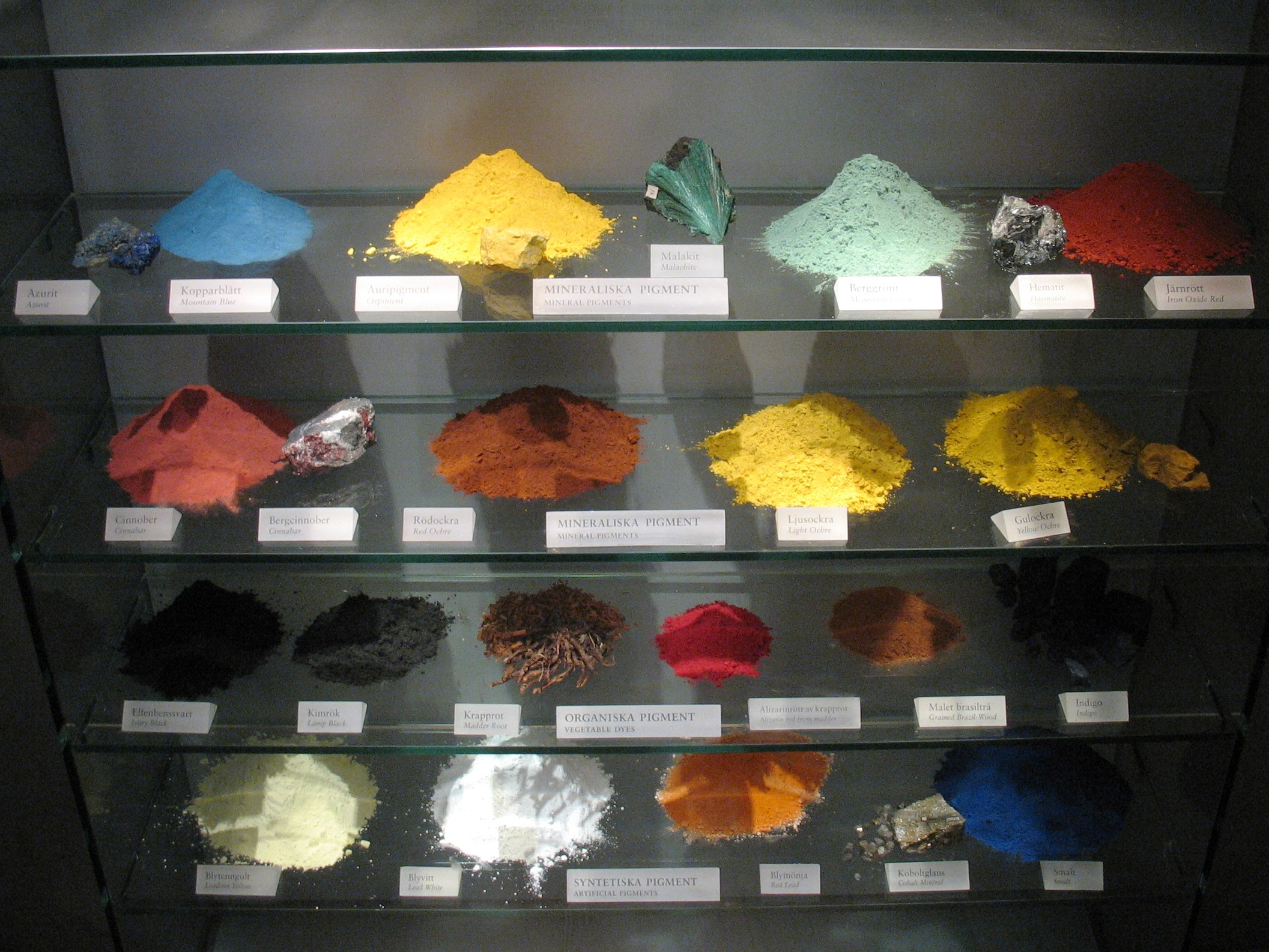
Color pigments used on the warship Vasa, with white lead second from left, bottom shelf

White lead is the basic lead carbonate 2PbCO_{3}·Pb(OH)_{2}. It is a complex salt, containing both carbonate and hydroxide ions. White lead occurs naturally as a mineral, in which context it is known as hydrocerussite, a hydrate of cerussite. It was formerly used as an ingredient for lead paint and a cosmetic called Venetian ceruse, because of its opacity and the satiny smooth mixture it made with dryable oils. However, it tended to cause lead poisoning, and its use has been banned in most countries.

Basic lead carbonate is produced by treating lead acetate with carbon dioxide and air. In the laboratory procedure treats lead acetate with urea. It occurs naturally as the mineral cerussite. The compound has been characterized by X-ray crystallography, which confirms the formula. The structure is complicated, featuring two kinds of Pb(II) sites, those bonded to hydroxide and those bonded to carbonate and hydroxide.

== Related white lead compounds ==
White lead compounds known as lead soap were used as additive for lubricants for bearings and in machine shops. Lead soap was also used as an oil drying agent for paints made with drying oil or air drying paints made with alkyd resins. Lead is often used with cobalt driers. Lead free substitutes have been developed to replace this use of lead in paint.

A second basic lead carbonate is known with the formula 6Pb(CO_{3})·3Pb(OH)_{6}·PbO.

== History ==
What is commonly known today as the "Dutch method" for the preparation of white lead was described as early as Theophrastus of Eresos (ca. 300 BC), in his brief work on rocks or minerals, On Stones or History of Stones. His directions for the process were repeated throughout history by many authors of chemical and alchemical literature. The uses of cerussa were described as an external medication and pigment.

According to Suda, Thespis before he introduced the mask in the ancient theater, he performed having rubbed his face with white lead. The Roman Emperor Elagabalus was said to have used white lead and alkanet as eye makeup.

Clifford Dyer Holley quotes from Theophrastus' History of Stones as follows, in his book The Lead and Zinc Pigments.

"Lead is placed in earthen vessels over sharp vinegar, and after it has acquired some thickness of a sort of rust, which it commonly does in about ten days, they open the vessels and scrape it off, as it were, in a sort of foulness; they then place the lead over vinegar again, repeating over and over again the same method of scraping it till it has wholly dissolved. What has been scraped off they then beat to powder and boil for a long time, and what at last subsides to the bottom of the vessel is ceruse."

Later descriptions of the Dutch process involved casting metallic lead as thin buckles and corroded with acetic acid in the presence of carbon dioxide. This was done by placing them over pots with a little vinegar (which contains acetic acid). These were stacked up and covered with a mixture of decaying dung and spent tanner's bark, which supplied the CO_{2}, and left for six to fourteen weeks, by which time the blue-grey lead had corroded to white lead. The pots were then taken to a separating table where scraping and pounding removed the white lead from the buckles. The powder was then dried and packed for shipment or shipped as a paste. One benefit of the process was that it was not necessary to dry the paste of white lead, removing its water. All that needed was to mill the paste with linseed oil, and the white lead would take up the oil and reject the residual water, to give white lead in oil.

== Paints ==
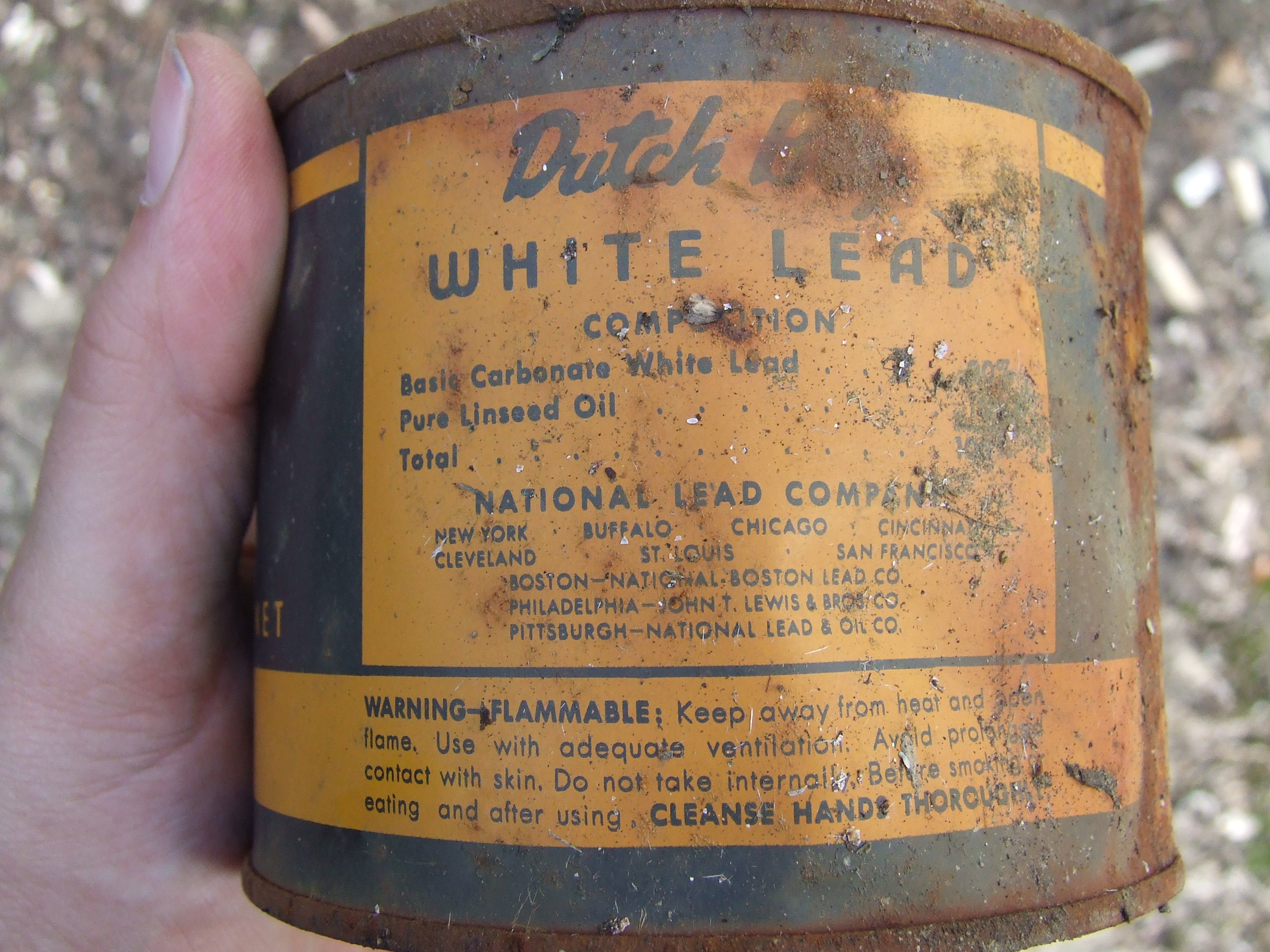
Can of Dutch Boy Paint, consisting of basic lead carbonate and linseed oil

White lead has been mostly supplanted in artistic use by titanium white, which has much higher tinting strength than white lead. Critics argue that substitutes like zinc oxide and titanium dioxide are more reactive, become brittle, and can flake off. White lead is less used by today's painters, not because of its toxicity directly; but simply because its toxicity in other contexts has led to trade restrictions that make white lead difficult for artists to obtain in sufficient quantities. Winsor & Newton, the English paint company, was restricted in 2014 from selling its flake white in tubes and now must sell exclusively in 150 ml (5.3 imp fl oz; 5.1 US fl oz) tins.

In the eighteenth century, white lead paints were routinely used to repaint the hulls and floors of Royal Navy vessels, to waterproof the timbers and limit infestation by shipworm.

=== Other synonyms (as an art pigment) ===
Among the synonyms for white lead are Berlin white, Cremnitz white, Dutch white lead, flake white, Flemish white, Krems white, London white, Pigment White 1, Roman white, silver white, slate white and Vienna white.

== See also ==
- List of inorganic pigments
- White Lead (Painting) Convention, 1921
