= Matlockite =

Rare lead halide mineral

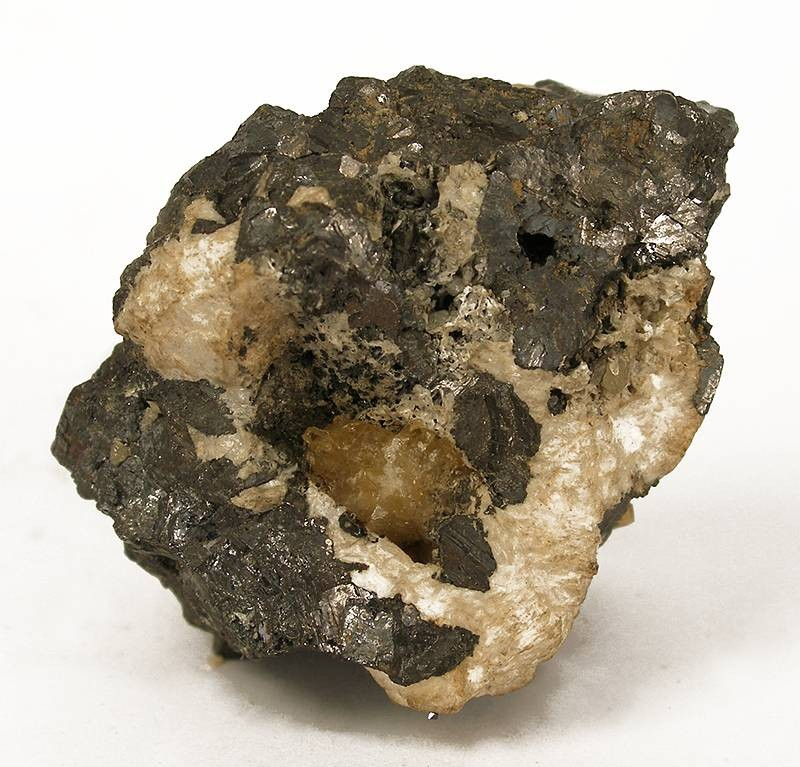

General
- Category: Halide minerals
- Formula: PbFCl
- IMA symbol: Mtl
- Strunz classification: 3.DC.25
- Dana classification: 9.2.11.1
- Crystal system: Tetragonal
- Crystal class: Ditetragonal dipyramidal (4/mmm); H-M symbol: (4/m 2/m 2/m)
- Space group: P4/nmm
- Unit cell: a = 4.11 Å, c = 7.23 Å; Z = 2

Identification
- Colour: Colourless to yellow and greenish
- Crystal habit: Flattened, tabular crystals occurring as aggregates, rosettelike, radiating, hemispherical; also massive
- Cleavage: {001}, perfect
- Fracture: Uneven to subconchoidal
- Tenacity: Brittle
- Mohs scale hardness: 2.5 – 3
- Luster: Adamantine, pearly on {001}
- Diaphaneity: Transparent
- Specific gravity: 7.1 – 7.2
- Optical properties: Uniaxial (−)
- Refractive index: n_{ω} = 2.150 n_{ε} = 2.040

Matlockite is a rare lead halide mineral, named after the town of Matlock in Derbyshire, England, where it was first discovered in a nearby mine. Matlockite (chemical formula: PbFCl) gives its name to the matlockite group which consists of rare minerals of a similar structure.

== Description ==
The mineral, a lead fluorochloride (formula PbFCl), was discovered sometime around the early 1800s at Bage Mine at Bolehill near Matlock, together with specimens of phosgenite and anglesite. In 1802, the mineralogist John Mawe described a mineral he called "glass lead" in his book Mineralogy of Derbyshire. Although phosgenite was known at this time, it seems likely that matlockite itself remained unappreciated as a new mineral for some fifty years. It was given the name by Greg in 1851. The first mention of matlockite may have been in Mawe's Mineralogy of Derbyshire in 1802 in which he gives a detailed description of phosgenite, which is then followed by a mention of a mineral he refers to as "glass lead" – a description which does rather equate to the appearance of matlockite. It is a light, translucent creamy-yellow colour, but heavy in weight having a density that is over 7.1.

A very large specimen 10 cm across, and originating from Derbyshire, exists in the collections of the American Museum of Natural History. A 7 cm specimen can be found in the collection of Derby Museum and Art Gallery.

Matlockite has been reported from a variety of locations since its discovery at the type locality of Derbyshire. The mineral is also found in Tiger, Arizona, Laurium in Greece, a mine near Essen in Germany and near Campiglia in Tuscany. Samples have also been found at locations in South Africa, Peru, Chile, Australia, Austria, France and Italy.

== Matlockite group ==
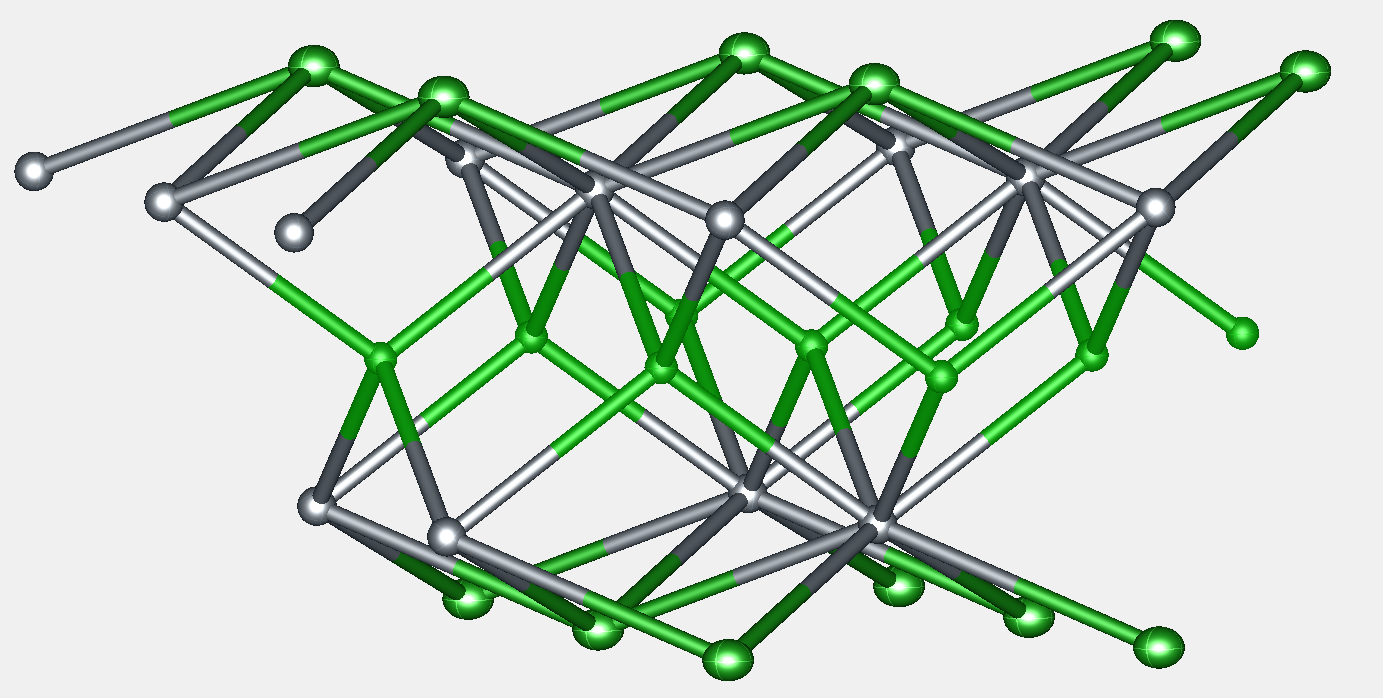
Structure of PbFCl (matlockite). The larger green spheres are chloride, the tetrahedrally bonded green spheres are fluoride.

The matlockite group consists of a number of minerals which share a similar crystal structure. The group includes bismuth, lead or calcium halides: bismoclite (BiO)Cl, daubréeite (BiO)(OH,Cl), laurionite PbCl(OH), paralaurionite PbCl(OH), rorisite CaFCl, zavaritskite (BiO)F and the eponymous matlockite.
