= Phosgenite =

Rare mineral

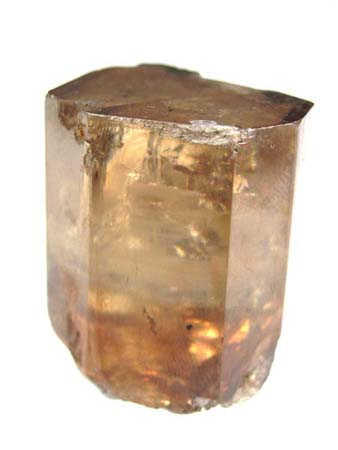
- Crystal of phosgenite from the Monteponi Mine, Iglesias, Sardinia, Italy (size: 3.0 x 3.0 x 2.5 cm)

General
- Category: Carbonate minerals
- Formula: (PbCl)_{2}CO_{3}
- IMA symbol: Pho
- Strunz classification: 5.BE.20
- Crystal system: Tetragonal
- Crystal class: Ditetragonal dipyramidal (4/mmm); H-M symbol: (4/m 2/m 2/m)
- Space group: P4/mbm
- Unit cell: a = 8.16 Å, c = 8.883(6) Å; Z = 4

Identification
- Color: Pale yellow to yellowish brown, pale brown, smoky brown, smoky violet, colorless, pale rose, gray, yellowish gray, pale green
- Crystal habit: Short prismatic crystals, granular, massive
- Cleavage: Distinct on {001} and {110}, indistinct on {100}
- Fracture: Conchoidal
- Tenacity: Sectile, flexible perpendicular to {001}
- Mohs scale hardness: 2–3
- Luster: Adamantine
- Streak: White
- Diaphaneity: Transparent to translucent
- Specific gravity: 6.12 – 6.15
- Optical properties: Uniaxial (+); anomalously biaxial if strained
- Refractive index: n_{ω} = 2.118 n_{ε} = 2.145
- Birefringence: δ = 0.027
- Pleochroism: Weakly pleochroic with O – reddish and E – greenish in thick sections.
- Ultraviolet fluorescence: Fluoresces yellow under LW and SW UV
- Solubility: Soluble in dilute nitric acid with effervescence, decomposes slowly in cold water

Phosgenite is a rare mineral consisting of lead carbonate chloride, (PbCl)_{2}CO_{3}. The tetragonal crystals are prismatic or tabular in habit: they are usually colorless and transparent, and have a brilliant adamantine lustre. Sometimes the crystals have a curious helical twist about the tetrad or principal axis. The hardness is 3 and the specific gravity 6.3. The mineral is rather sectile, and consequently was earlier known as corneous lead (German: Hornblei).

== Name and occurrence ==
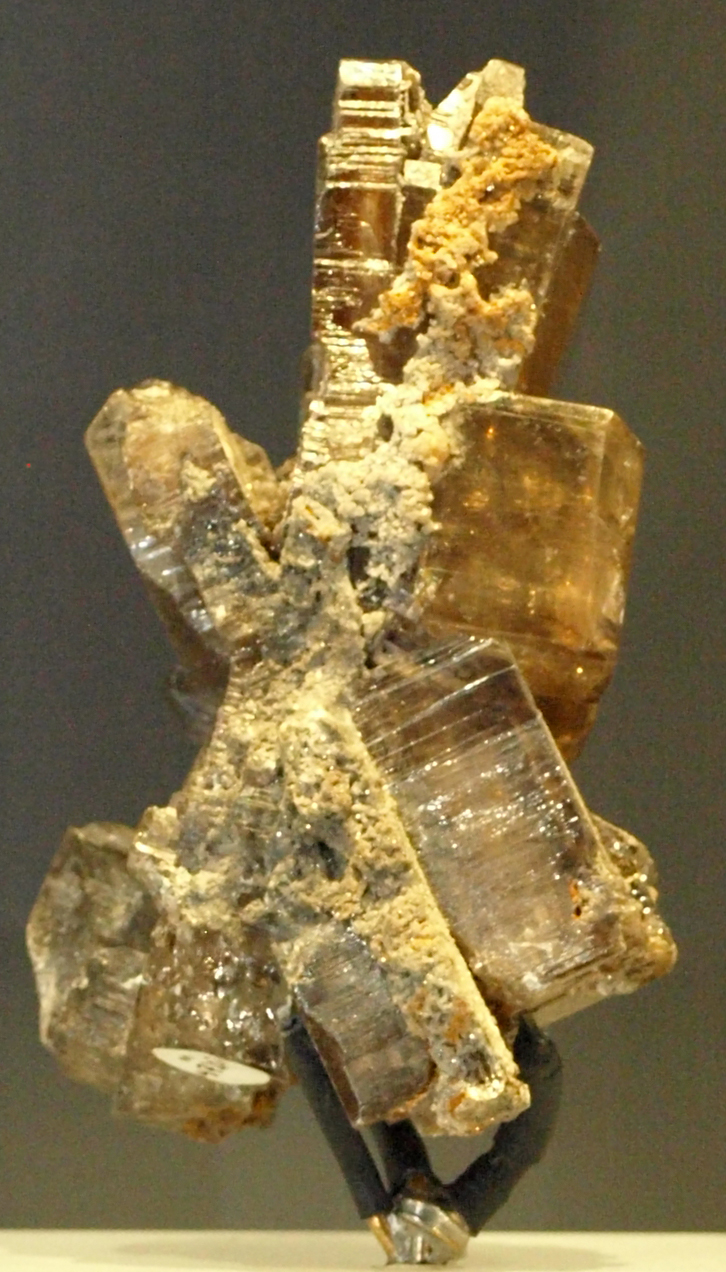
An example of the mineral Phosgenite on display at the Royal Ontario Museum

The name phosgenite was given by August Breithaupt in 1820, after phosgene, carbon oxychloride, because the mineral contains the elements carbon, oxygen, and chlorine.

It was found associated with anglesite and matlockite in cavities within altered galena in a lead mine at Cromford, near Matlock: hence its common name cromfordite. Crystals are also found in galena at Monteponi near Iglesias in Sardinia, and near Dundas in Tasmania. It has also been reported from Laurium, Greece; Tarnowitz, Poland; the Altai district, Siberia; the Touissit mine, near Oujda, Morocco; Sidi Amor ben Salem, Tunisia; Tsumeb, Namibia; Broken Hill, New South Wales; and Boleo, near Santa Rosalía, Baja California Sur. In the US it has been reported from the Terrible mine, Custer County, Colorado; the Stevenson-Bennett mine, Organ Mountains, Doña Ana County, New Mexico; and the Mammoth mine, Tiger, Pinal County, Arizona.

Crystals of phosgenite, and also of the corresponding bromine compound (PbBr)_{2}CO_{3}, have been prepared artificially.

== See also ==
- Barstowite, another lead chloride carbonate
