= Cavallier =

Cavallier is a French surname. It may refer to:

- Camille Cavallier (1854–1926), French iron master
- Jacques Cavallier (born 1962), French perfumer
- Marie Cavallier (born 1976), Princess Marie of Denmark, Countess of Monpezat
