= Humbert de Wendel =

French steelmaker and industrialist

Jean Marie Humbert de Wendel
- Humbert de Wendel
- Born: 4 February 1876; Paris, France
- Died: 14 November 1954 (aged 78)
- Occupation: Industrialist

Humbert de Wendel (4 February 1876 – 14 November 1954) was a French steelmaker who came from a long line of Lorrainian industrialists. He and his brother François de Wendel were among the leaders of the French steel industry from before World War I until after World War II.

== Origins ==
The de Wendel family can be traced back to Jean Wendel of Bruges, who married Marie de Wanderve around 1600. His descendants in the male line mostly pursued military careers. Jean's descendant Jean-Martin Wendel (1665–1737) purchased the factories of Le Comte in Hayange, Lorraine, in 1704. This was the foundation of the family's industrial operations. He was followed by eight generations of steelmakers. After the German annexation of Alsace-Lorraine, Les Petits-Fils de François de Wendel et Cie (PFFW) controlled the Wendel family's steel operations in Lorraine, while Wendel et Cie owned the French Wendel properties around Jœuf.

== Life ==
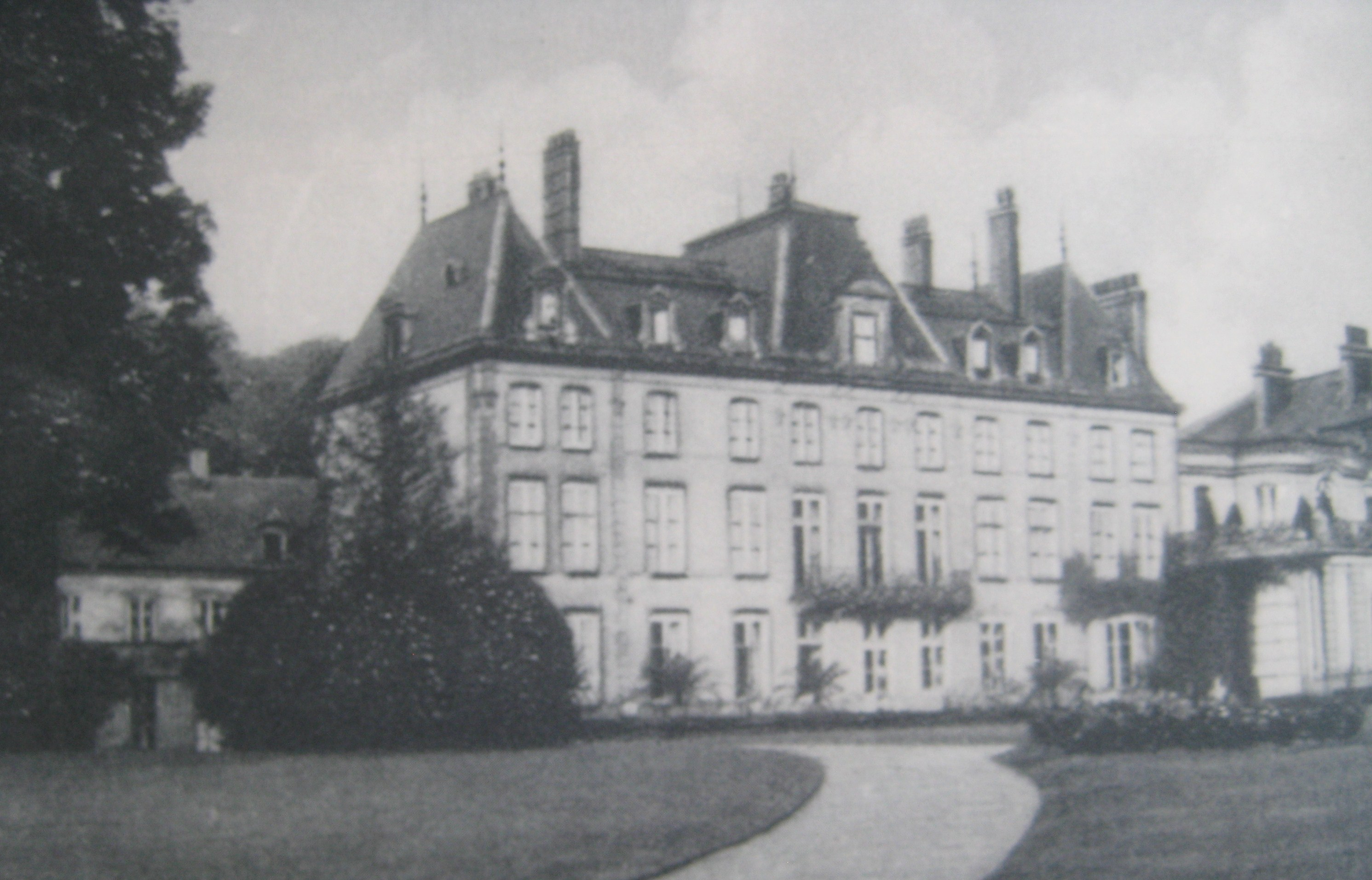
Château Humbert de Wendel in Hayange (demolished in 2007)

=== Pre-war period (1876–1914) ===
Jean Marie Humbert de Wendel was born on 4 February 1876 in Paris VIII. His parents were Henri de Wendel (1844–1906), a steelmaker, and Berthe de Corbel Corbeau de Vaulserre (1849–1918). His father was elected to the Reichstag for Thionville - Boulay in 1884 and reelected in 1887 as a "protesting deputy", one who objected to the annexation of Alsace-Lorraine to the German Empire by the Treaty of Frankfurt (1871) without having consulted the people. Humbert's elder brother was François Augustin Marie de Wendel (1874-1949) and his younger brother was Maurice Marie Ignace de Wendel (1879–1961). In 1892 his brother François chose to become a naturalized French citizen, and Humbert followed his lead later. Humbert was very discreet in politics, and did not support his elder brother's involvement in public affairs, which led to François being elected a deputy for Briey in 1914. In the pre-war period Humbert de Wendel controlled the Hayange football club.

François became a gérant of PFFW in 1903, and Humbert became a gérant in 1906. The three brothers, François, Humbert and Maurice, worked closely together. Often they spent the day in the same office and then shared the evening meal. Maurice handled public relations and social welfare, while Humbert managed commercial matters and relations with industry organisations. The brothers later said they were so close due to their shared difficulties with the German authorities. Humbert wrote, "My brothers and I were authorized to visit Lorraine only a few weeks each year. This stringency of the German administration appeared to compromise our future in the family management; it provided a disposition that loved independence more than orders with a sufficient reason to direct its choice toward careers that left more room for a cult of oneself."

=== World War I (1914–19) ===
At the outbreak of World War I the three brothers left Hayange in Lorraine and drove to Paris. In 1915 Humbert was sent to London where he worked with the British government over the supply of industrial materials. The military attaché to the French Embassy, who supervised Humbert de Wendel's purchases of metals, was Général Louis de La Panouse (1863–1945). Through his wife, Sabine de Wendel, he was Humbert de Wendel's cousin. Later a parliamentary commission was set up to review profits made by suppliers of war materials. François de Wendel drew up the report of metal industry contracts. Due to this involvement, there were allegations that the Wendels used their positions to further their interests, but their Lorraine steelworks were behind the German lines throughout the war. The Wendels simply provided their expertise in metallurgy and metal markets to the French state.

Towards the end of World War I (1914–18) study groups under Humbert de Wendel requested a postwar settlement in which the Saar would be ceded, Alsace-Lorraine returned to France and Luxembourg transferred from the German customs union to a new union with Belgium. Camille Cavallier was one of a small number of iron masters who also wanted the left bank of the Rhine. The Comité des forges, the steelmakers' association, wanted to keep German steel producers out of French markets while maintaining free access to German markets from the Lorraine producers. On 23 August 1917 Robert Pinot, secretary of the Comité des forges, wrote to Humbert, then president of the Union des industries et métiers de la métallurgie (UIMM). He saw that in many ways the collective strength of workers had grown during the war, and French industry must therefore become better organized as a group to defend their interests in the postwar period.

=== Inter-war period (1919–39) ===
In 1922 Humbert de Wendel was President of the Metz Chamber of Commerce, and was involved in discussions over canalizing the Moselle for barge traffic. The project was eventually carried out between 1929 and 1932 using German labour and other resources provided as war reparations. Under prime minister Raymond Poincaré the French began the occupation of the Ruhr in January 1923. German passive resistance resulted in reduced flow of coal to France. Humbert de Wendel stated that by May three quarters of the Meurthe-et-Moselle blast furnaces had shut down.

On 30 January 1926 Humbert de Wendel met in Luxembourg with Fritz Thyssen and Charles François Laurent in a meeting chaired by Émile Mayrisch where they reviewed and approved a draft proposal by Thyssen for an international steel cartel. After further negotiations, this led to creation of the International Steel Entente (Entente Internationale de l'Acier) on 30 September 1926, which defined a system of quotas for Germany, France, Belgium, Luxembourg and the Saar.

At the end of 1937 PFFW had a capital stock of 117 million francs and De Wendel et Cie had a capital stock of 80 million francs. François and Maurice de Wendel had official positions in sixteen other companies. These included the Banque de l'Union Parisienne, Suez, Société minière et métallurgique de Peñarroya, Union des Mines, several coal mining companies, two tin companies, other iron and steel manufacturing companies and insurance companies.

=== World War II (1939–45) ===
During World War II the Wendel works were occupied by German troops on 16 June 1940. After the capitulation of France the Germans wanted to get the works back into operation as quickly as possible. Francois and Humbert de Wendel were shown an authorization by Hermann Göring on 12 July 1940 for the Saar businessman Hermann Röchling to take control of the works. The Wendels were forced to leave Lorraine on 48 hours notice. Röchling pledged to destroy the Wendel family interests.

Under the Vichy regime the Comité des forges was dissolved by decree on 9 November 1940. It was replaced by the Comité d'organisation de la sidérurgie (CORSID – Organizing Committee for the Iron and Steel Industry). The Commission générale was created in 1941, with similar membership to the Comité des forges: five members were removed and three added. Both François and Humbert de Wendel were appointed to the Commission générale.

=== Last years (1945–54) ===
After the war Hermann Röchling was tried at a special tribunal in Rastatt. Humbert de Wendel stated in an affidavit that he considered, "the defendant a pan-Germanist of the old school, who gave total support to Hitler because he saw in him a man capable of achieving the 'Deutschland über Alles!'. But [Röchling] did not swallow all the stupidity of the Nazi Party. ... He was a man of the Reichswehr [sic] but not the Gestapo." De Wendel said Röchling had resisted the expulsion of French personnel by Gauleiter Josef Bürckel, had stopped the Gestapo from placing their agents in the factories, had often intervened on behalf of French employees with the police and had appointed excellent German administrators.

In March 1947 Humbert proposed that the PFFW should build a new strip mill at a cost of six billion francs. In 1951 Humbert de Wendel and the director of the Knutange steelworks were the leaders of opposition from the steel industry of Lorraine to organization of the steel industry on a Europe-wide basis by the European Coal and Steel Community. Humbert de Wendel died on 14 November 1954.

== Sources ==
- Bourelly, "Jean Marie Humbert de Wendel", Geneanet (in French)
- Boyce, Robert (2005-06-20), French Foreign and Defence Policy, 1918-1940: The Decline and Fall of a Great Power, Routledge, ISBN 978-1-134-74827-3
- Brady, Robert A. (2001), Business As a System of Power, Transaction Publishers, ISBN 978-1-4128-1902-2
- Brunet, Luc-André (2017-06-08), Forging Europe: Industrial Organisation in France, 1940–1952, Springer, ISBN 978-1-349-95198-7
- Cermakian, Jean (1975-12-15), The Moselle: River and Canal from the Roman Empire to the European Economic Community, University of Toronto Press, Scholarly Publishing Division, ISBN 978-1-4426-5457-0
- "François de WENDEL (1874-1949)", Annales des Mines (in French)
- Gillingham, John (2014-09-19), Industry and Politics in the Third Reich (RLE Nazi Germany & Holocaust): Ruhr Coal, Hitler and Europe, Routledge, ISBN 978-1-317-63418-8
- James, Harold (2009-06-30), Family Capitalism: Wendels, Haniels, Falcks, and the Continental European Model, Harvard University Press, ISBN 978-0-674-03909-4
- "Le Château", Le Château Guy de Wendel, archived from the original on 2017-06-28
- Les députés protestataires d'Alsace-Lorraine : Les députés allemands (in French), Assemblée nationale
- Maier, Charles S. (2015-10-27), Recasting Bourgeois Europe: Stabilization in France, Germany, and Italy in the Decade after World War I, Princeton University Press, ISBN 978-1-4008-7370-8
- Mioche, Philippe (1992), "LES ENTREPRISES SIDÉRURGIQUES SOUS L'OCCUPATION", Histoire, Économie et Société (in French), 11 (3), Armand Colin: 397–414, doi:10.3406/hes.1992.1640, JSTOR 23611249
- Pfeil, Ulrich (2010-05-07), Football et identité: en France et en Allemagne (in French), Presses Univ. Septentrion, ISBN 978-2-7574-0156-9
- Rochebrune, Renaud de; Hazera, Jean-Claude (2013-03-21), Patrons sous l'Occupation (Les) (in French), Odile Jacob, ISBN 978-2-7381-2938-3
- Sinanoglou, Ioannis (April 1988), "Review: Capitalism at War: Industrial Policy and Bureaucracy in France, 1914-1918 by John F. Godfrey", French Politics and Society, 6 (2), Berghahn Books, JSTOR 42844895
- "Wendel", Section Genealogique, Association Artistique de la Banque de France, archived from the original on 2016-03-03
