= François de Wendel =

French industrialist and politician

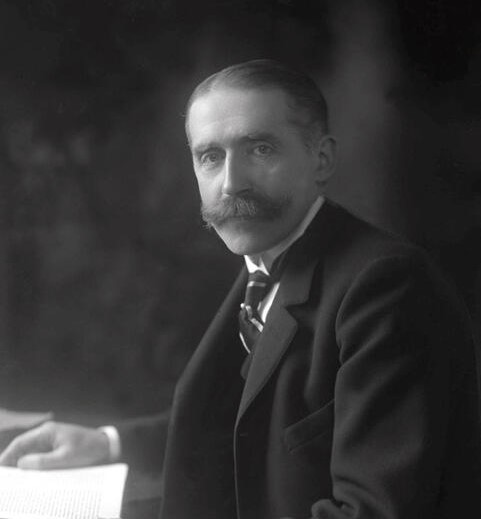

Deputy for Meurthe-et-Moselle
- In office 26 April 1914 – 27 January 1933

Senator for Meurthe-et-Moselle
- In office 10 January 1933 – 31 December 1941
- Preceded by: Albert François Lebrun

Personal details
- Born: François Augustin Marie de Wendel d'Hayange; 5 May 1874 Paris, France
- Died: 13 January 1949 (aged 74) Paris, France
- Occupation: Industrialist, politician

François de Wendel (5 May 1874 – 13 January 1949) was a French industrialist and politician. He inherited the leadership of a major steel manufacturer in Lorraine at a time when it was part of Germany, and in Meurthe-et-Moselle in France to the west. He entered national politics just before World War I (1914–18), holding office first as a deputy and then as a senator until after the defeat of France in World War II (1939–45). His position as a deputy and also as head of the largest industrial enterprise in France inevitably led to accusations that he was manipulating policy in favor of his business empire.

== Origins ==
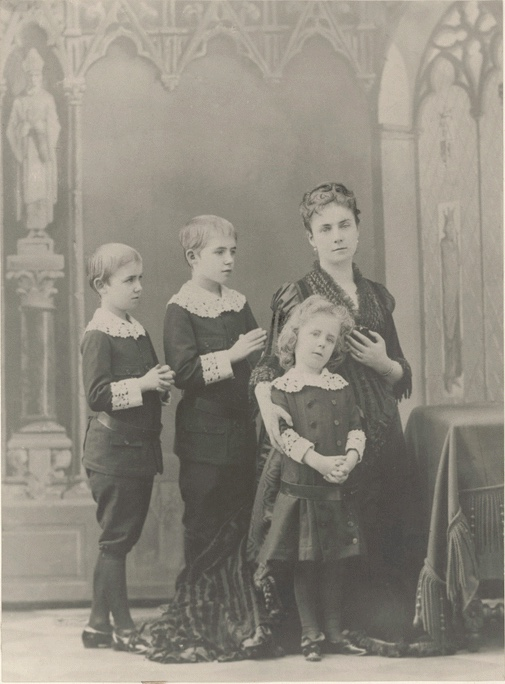
Photograph of his mother, Berthe de Corbel-Corbeau de Vaulserre, with François and his two brothers, Maurice and Humbert, c. 1890

The de Wendel family can be traced back to Jean Wendel of Bruges, who married Marie de Wanderve around 1600. His descendants in the male line mostly pursued military careers. Jean's descendant Jean-Martin Wendel (1665–1737) purchased an ironworks in Hayange, Lorraine, in 1704. This was the foundation of the family's industrial operations. His nobility was confirmed as Jean-Martin de Wendel in 1727 by Leopold, Duke of Lorraine. He was followed by eight generations of steelmakers. The Petits-fils de François de Wendel et Cie (PFFW) was created by Henri de Wendel in 1871 to control the Wendel family's steel operations in Lorraine, at that time annexed to Germany, while Wendel et Cie controlled the operations in France.

== Early years (1874–1914) ==
=== Birth and education ===
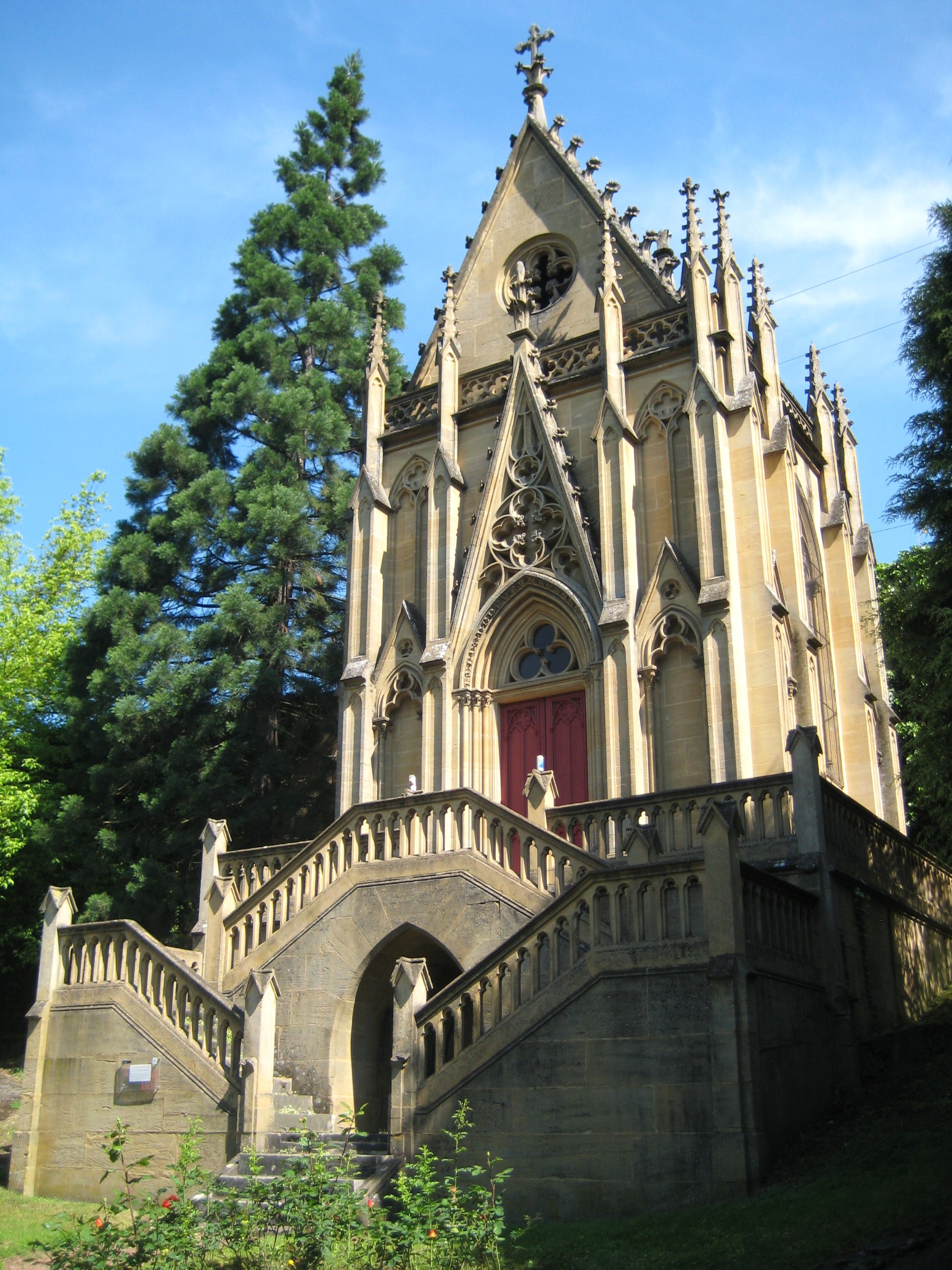
Former sepulchral chapel of the Wendels in Hayange

François de Wendel was born in Paris on 5 May 1874. His parents were Henri de Wendel (1844–1906), an industrialist, and Berthe Corbel-Corbeau de Vaulserre. His mother, who died in 1918, was from a Savoy family of ancient nobility. François was the oldest of three sons, followed by Humbert de Wendel (1876–1954) and Maurice de Wendel (1879–1961). He spent his childhood at Hayange, where his family had operated factories since 1704.

François de Wendel left Lorraine in 1891 to avoid German military service, and finished his secondary education in a Jesuit lycée in Paris. His permit to leave Lorraine prohibited him from returning. In 1892 François chose to become a naturalized French citizen. His brother Humbert followed his lead later. He obtained his baccalauréats in letters and sciences, then in 1894 entered the Ecole des Mines, graduating five years later. During this period he completed one year of military service in Chartres in the 130th Regiment (1896). In 1899 he earned a diploma of civil engineer of mines. He traveled in the US until 1901, studying the steel industry there.

François de Wendel married Odette Humann in 1905, daughter of Admiral Edgar Humann (1838–1914), known for the conquest of Tonkin. Their children were Marguerite, Odile, Isabelle and Henri (1913–82).

=== Family business ===
As soon as he finished his studies François de Wendel began to work with Henri and Robert de Wendel, his father and uncle in the family business. After the death of Robert de Wendel, in 1903 he became a gérant of PFFW in Hayange and Wendel et Cie in Jœuf, both of which he managed until his death in partnership with his brothers and cousins. His brother Humbert became a gérant in 1906. During this period the company developed the factories and also built schools, a hospital, a church, a nursery and many houses. It created a mutual aid society, and began a program of staff pensions, innovative for the time.

The three brothers, François, Humbert and Maurice, worked together. Maurice handled public relations and social welfare, while Humbert managed the steel mills and relations with the German cartels. The brothers later said they were so close due to their shared difficulties with the German authorities.

Wendel undertook considerable development of the metallurgical facilities. He was particularly interested in the mines and blast furnaces, but made sure that all aspects were considered. Between 1908 and 1913 he built the new Pâtural plant at Hayange using American concepts such as blast furnaces with armoured shafts and skip chargers.

=== Political activity ===
In his youth, François de Wendel was a proponent of Capitaine Dreyfus's innocence, which put him at odds with his aristocratic milieu. In 1900 François de Wendel became a councilor of the canton of Briey, Meurthe-et-Moselle. From 1906 he subsidized L'Echo de Lorraine and was a shareholder in L'Éclair de l'Est. In 1906 he ran for deputy for the Briey district against the incumbent, Albert François Lebrun, at a time when the separation of church and state was a central issue. He was accused of being too tied to the church and was decisively defeated. He was elected a general councillor for Meurthe-et-Moselle in 1907. He ran for deputy again in 1910, creating the Briey Chamber of Commerce to organize support. He downplayed relations with the church, made it clear he was a republican, and was helped by Aristide Briand and Alexandre Millerand of the Democratic Left Party, but was defeated again, although this time by a narrow margin. Wendel was convinced, perhaps correctly, that Camille Cavallier had engineered his defeat since he distrusted Wendel's dealings with union leaders and thought he had encouraged a strike at his Pont-à-Mousson iron works.

On 26 April 1914 François de Wendel once more ran for election to the legislature in the second district of Briey. He was elected on the Fédération républicaine platform as a deputy for Meurthe-et-Moselle, holding office until 7 December 1919. The family opposed his entry into politics, which they thought likely to damage the firm, as did his fellow-members of the Comité des forges. He would indeed often be accused, wrongly, of acting in the interests of his industrial empire rather than those of France, and this may have damaged the business. After the post-war slump of 1920 caused unemployment to rise the Wendels were often cast as the villains. François de Wendel was attacked over his role in World War I, his opposition to the Cartel des Gauches led by Édouard Herriot in 1924–26 and his support of the nationalist and conservative Raymond Poincaré.

== World War I (1914–19) ==
Northeast France

At the outbreak of World War I the three brothers left Hayange in Lorraine and drove to Paris by car. François de Wendel was assigned to the Permanent Inspection of Manufacturing. He intervened in the Chamber over fuel supplies and the organization of war factories. He was a member of committees on War Damage and Invaded Regions. He assisted refugees and prisoners from Alsace-Lorraine, and formed a study group on Lorraine with Canon Collin and Ambassador Bompard.

Humbert de Wendel was sent to London where he worked with the British government over the supply of arms. Later a parliamentary commission was set up to review profits made by suppliers of war materials. François de Wendel drew up the report of metal industry contracts. Due to this involvement, there were allegations that the Wendels used their positions to further their interests, but their Lorraine steelworks were behind German lines throughout the war and earned them no benefits. The Wendels simply provided their expertise in metallurgy and metal markets to the French state.

== Inter-war period (1918–39) ==
=== Political career ===
François de Wendel was reelected deputy for Meurthe-et-Moselle from 16 November 1919 to 31 May 1924 on the Groupe Entente républicaine démocratique platform, from 11 May 1924 to 31 May 1928 on the Union républicaine démocratique platform, from 22 April 1928 to 31 May 1932 on the Union républicaine démocratique platform and from 8 May 1932 to 27 January 1933 on the Fédération républicaine platform. As a deputy he was president of the Mines Committee and member of other committees including Social Insurance & Welfare, and Foreign Affairs. From 1919 onward he was a member of the Mines Advisory Committee. He intervened in many discussions, particularly those related to mines, war damages, finances and Alsace-Lorraine. He was again elected a general councillor for Meurthe-et-Moselle in 1931.

François de Wendel was elected a senator for Meurthe-et-Moselle on 16 October 1932 in place of Albert Lebrun, who was appointed President of the Republic. He held office from 10 January 1933 to 31 December 1941. In the Senate he was a member of the Mines Committee, and often was the rapporteur of this committee, and was a member of the committees on Public Works, Foreign Affairs, Finance and Armies. He was again involved in numerous discussions, including those related to mines and finances.

=== Plant modernization ===
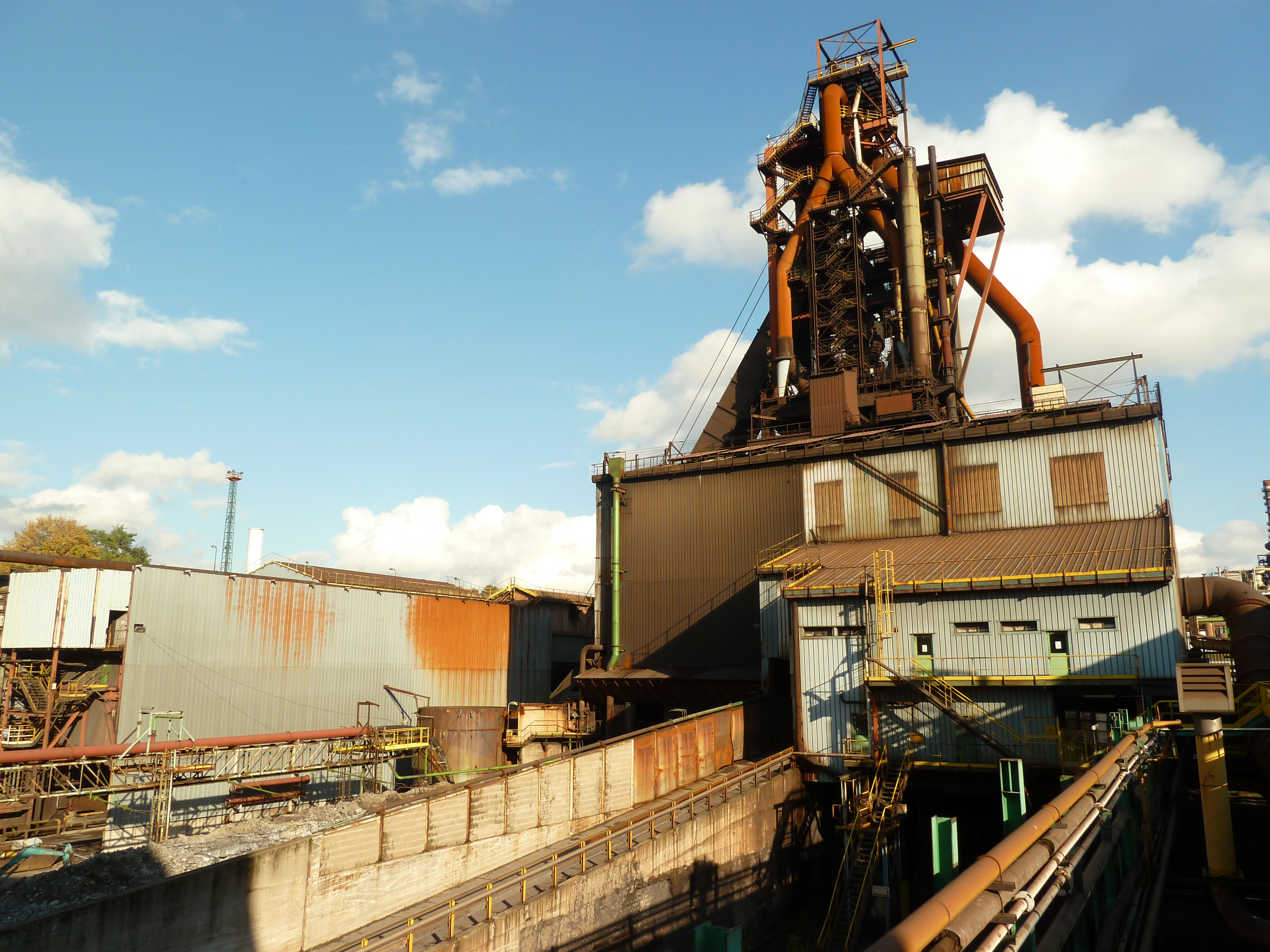
Pâtural Blast furnace P6, at Hayange

In 1920 the new Pâtural blast furnaces at Hayange were equipped with McKee revolving distributors. From 1919 to 1928 the old blast furnaces at Hayange were completely rebuilt to modern plans. Four blast furnaces were rebuilt, two of them 300 tons. From 1927 to 1930 the Fenderie factory was rebuilt, with the Martin furnaces expanded. Several times de Wendel sent teams of engineers to the US and Canada to observe the experiments with new processes for continuous strip rolling, and the solutions that were eventually adopted.

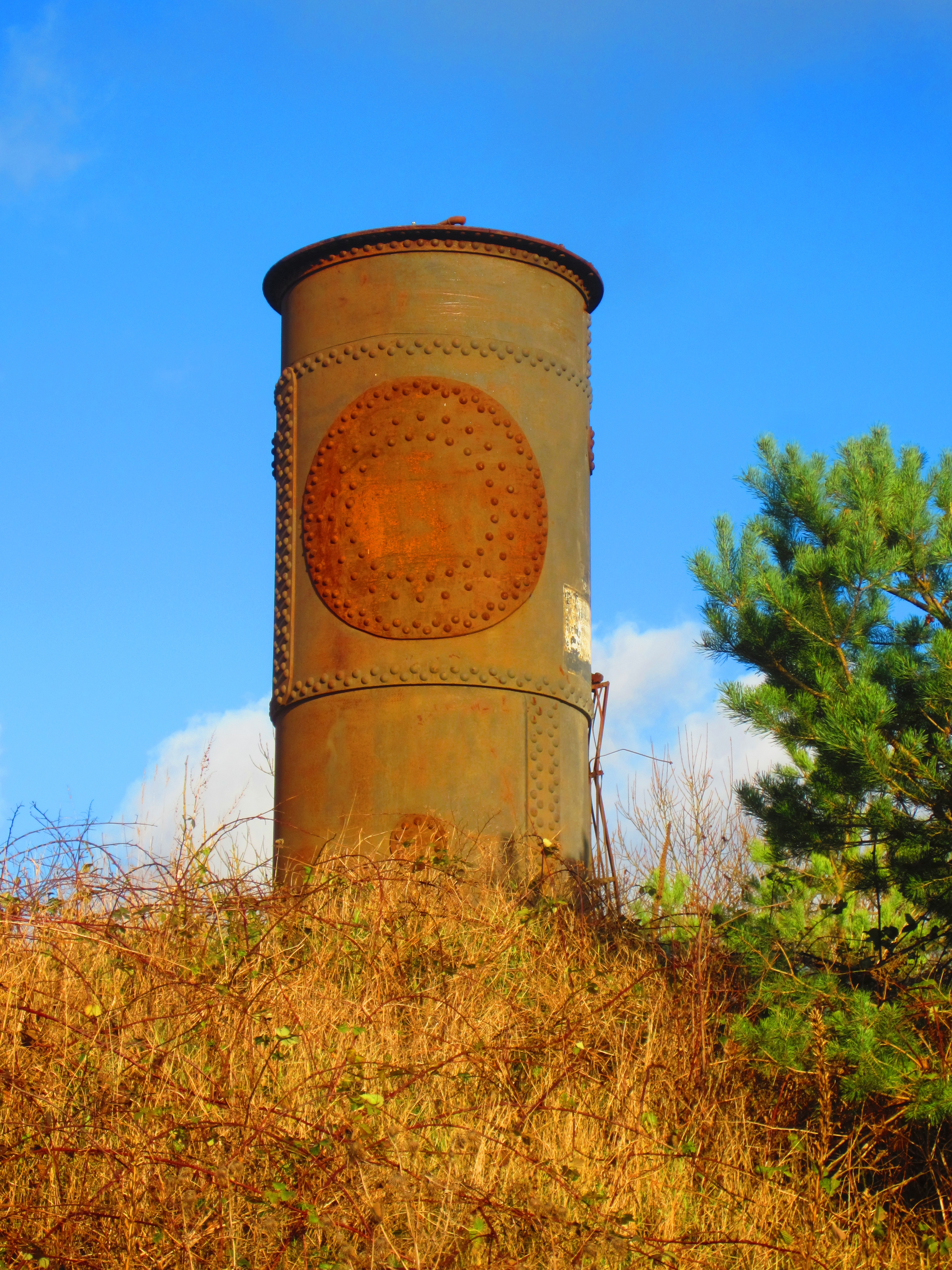
Shaft of an old factory in Moyeuvre

After the war, de Wendel installed an electric bloom-preheating oven at Moyeuvre-Grande, followed by a powerful continuous billet train, and began a complete overhaul of the blast furnaces along the lines of the successful model at Hayange, but with a more powerful type of blast furnace that processed 400 tons daily of minette. At Jœuf, where the Germans had completely dismantled the factory before their retreat, an enormous reconstruction task was undertaken very quickly, with the blast furnaces completely overhauled as at Moyeuvre. All the trains were then electrified. The Wendel plants were among the first to be electrified, using large gas-powered turbines, and a network of gas pipes was installed linking the plants.

=== Business interests ===
François de Wendel was a regent of the Bank of France from 1913 to 1936. François de Wendel, Théodore Laurent and Eugène Schneider formed a triumvirate that dominated French steel-making in the inter-war period. The De Wendel group was probably the most powerful industrial aggregation in France. In 1929 the de Wendel group was the largest employer in France, with about 33,000 workers. In 1929 François de Wendel was quietly involved in purchase of the moderate and neutral Le Temps, but never had exclusive control of that newspaper.

In 1936, Francois de Wendel was among the opponents of the Popular Front. On 7 June 1936 Alexandre Lambert-Ribot, secretary general of the Comité des forges, signed the Matignon Agreements to end the general strike that followed its election. Confédération générale de la production française President René-Paul Duchemin signed on behalf of French employers. Forces led by the Wendels and Rothschilds, who were hostile to Duchemin's labour policies, forced an Extraordinary General Assembly in August 1936 to reform the CGPF, which was renamed the Confédération générale du patronat français (CGPF) and given a new constitution and leadership. The changes were approved by the heavy industrialists, There were, for example, close links between Pierre Nicolle of the new CGPF and François de Wendel.

Over the years François de Wendel became a director of many companies, including the Société métallurgique de Knutange, Société électrique des Houillères du Pas-de-Calais, Étains et wolfram du Tonkin, Mines de Crespin, Étains du Cameroun, Compagnie indochinoise de métallurgie and Commission des ardoisières d’Angers (1931). At the end of 1937 PFFW had a capital stock of 117 million francs and De Wendel et Cie had a capital stock of 80 million francs. François and Maurice de Wendel had official positions in sixteen other companies. These included the Banque de l'Union Parisienne, Suez, Société minière et métallurgique de Peñarroya, Union des Mines, several coal.mining companies, two tin companies, other iron and steel manufacturing companies and insurance companies.

=== Comité des forges ===
François de Wendel was president of the Comité des forges de France from 1918 to 1940. In December 1918 the Comité des forges created the Comptoir sidérurgique de France, which allocated quotas to members of the steel cartel. During the war the government had run the National Coal Bureau with a system under which small steel producers who could not get cheap domestic coal were subsidized in buying more expensive imports. After the war the Comité des forges president François de Wendel asked that this function be transferred to a consortium organized by the committee. The small producers were opposed to this measure, which seemed likely to confirm the advantage of the large companies.

In the post-war period the Union des industries et métiers de la métallurgie (UIMM) acted in effect as the instrument of the Comité des forges for handling social issues. In 1919 Robert Pinot was secretary of both organizations. In 1921 Pinot asked Francois de Wendel to make him a vice-president of the Comité des forges. Although Pinot was committed and efficient, he had a tendency to take credit for the committee's actions. He was an employee rather than an owner, and de Wendel made it clear he would only be the most junior of five vice-presidents, with no prospect of becoming president.

== World War II and later years (1939–49) ==
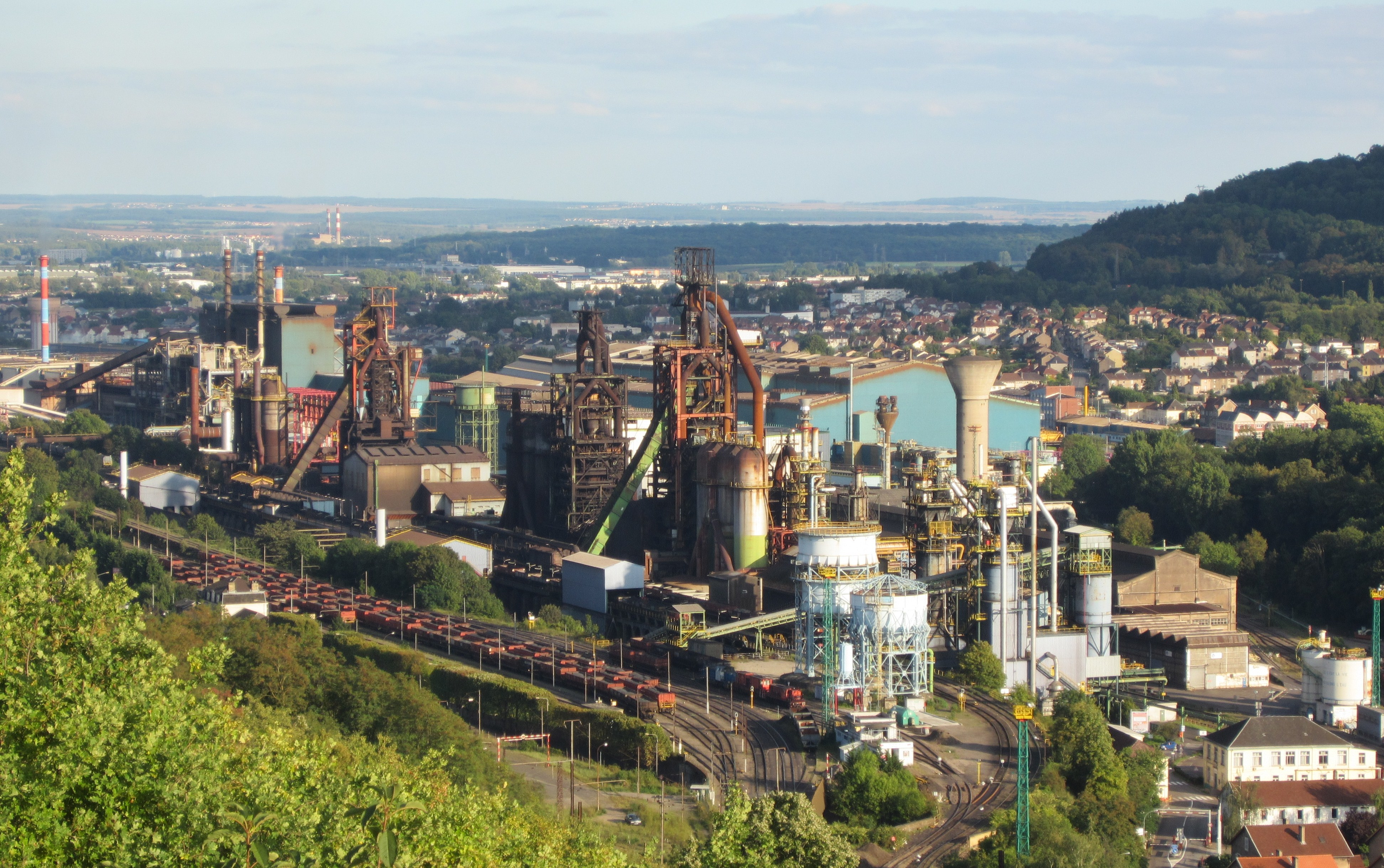
Steel works in Hayange in 2011

In June 1940 François de Wendel refrained from going to Vichy to vote full powers to Marshal Philippe Pétain, in a gesture of “discreet disapproval”. The Wendel works were occupied by German troops on 16 June 1940. After the capitulation of France the Germans wanted to get the works back into operation as quickly as possible. Francois and Humbert de Wendel were given permits to travel to Hayange, where they were shown an authorization by Hermann Göring on 12 July 1940 for the Saar businessman Hermann Röchling to take control of the works. The Wendels were forced to leave Lorraine on 48 hours notice. Röchling pledged to destroy the Wendel family interests.

Under the Vichy regime the Comité des forges was dissolved by decree on 9 November 1940. It was replaced by the Comité d'organisation de la sidérurgie (CORSID – Organizing Committee for the Iron and Steel Industry). François de Wendel was excluded from the CORSID. The Commission générale was created in 1941, with similar membership to the Comité des forges: five members were removed and three added. Both François and Humbert de Wendel were appointed to the Commission générale.

After World War II (1939–45) François de Wendel put his energy into rebuilding the Meurthe-et-Moselle metallurgical factories, and was also interested in the coal industry of Limburg in the Netherlands. His evaluation of the steel works around Hayange was that they were very antiquated, and were not worth a large investment in modernization. He wrote of the Pâtural plant in Hayange in May 1946, "If things depended solely on me, I would rebuild almost as it was ... I would strive, by reducing to a minimum the modifications brought to the previous construction, to build this furnace as quickly and as economically as possible. But it is important to remember that our projects will have to be approved by the Professional Office of the Steel Industry and that if we do not adopt a crucible diameter of 5.250 meters, we risk being considered retrogressives."

In January 1947 François de Wendel told the president of the Nancy Chamber of Commerce that proposals to undertake a major expansion of the steel industry were "both dishonest and foolish." In 1947 Konrad Adenauer and Robert Pferdmenges proposed to invite French companies to take controlling interests in major Ruhr steel producers. François de Wendel dismissed this plan out of hand when he was approached in November 1947.

François de Wendel died in Paris on 13 January 1949. He was replaced by his son, Henri.

== Sources ==
- 190AQ. WENDEL (François II et Maurice de) (in French), Archives nationales
- Bourelly, "Jean Marie Humbert de Wendel", Geneanet (in French)
- Brady, Robert A. (2001), Business As a System of Power, Transaction Publishers, ISBN 978-1-4128-1902-2
- Brunet, Luc-André (2017-06-08), Forging Europe: Industrial Organisation in France, 1940–1952, Springer, ISBN 978-1-349-95198-7
- Cassis, Youssef (1999), Big Business: The European Experience in the Twentieth Century, Oxford University Press, ISBN 978-0-19-829606-5
- Durand, Paul (13 January 1949), "M. FRANÇOIS DE WENDEL : Un grand patron et un grand Français", Le Lorrain (in French)
- François-Charles de Wendel (in French), Assemblée nationale
- "François de WENDEL (1874-1949)", Annales des Mines (in French)
- "François De Wendel : Ingénieur Civil Des Mines, Maître De Forges", Revue Technique Luxembourgeoise (in French), April–June 1949
- Gillingham, John (2014-09-19), Industry and Politics in the Third Reich (RLE Nazi Germany & Holocaust): Ruhr Coal, Hitler and Europe, Routledge, ISBN 978-1-317-63418-8
- Gordon, David M. (1996), Liberalism and Social Reform: Industrial Growth and Progressiste Politics in France, 1880-1914, Greenwood Publishing Group, ISBN 978-0-313-29811-0
- Guillaume, Sylvie (2008), Les PME Dans Les Sociétés Contemporaines de 1880 À Nos Jours: Pouvoir, Représentation, Action (in French), Peter Lang, ISBN 978-90-5201-432-6
- James, Harold (2009-06-30), Family Capitalism: Wendels, Haniels, Falcks, and the Continental European Model, Harvard University Press, ISBN 978-0-674-03909-4
- Jolly, Jean (1960–1977), "WENDEL (FRANÇOIS, AUGUSTIN, MARIE de)", Dictionnaire des parlementaires français de 1889 à 1940, Paris: Presses universitaires de France, ISBN 2-1100-1998-0
- "Le Château", Le Château Guy de Wendel, archived from the original on 2017-06-28
- Maier, Charles S. (2015-10-27), Recasting Bourgeois Europe: Stabilization in France, Germany, and Italy in the Decade after World War I, Princeton University Press, ISBN 978-1-4008-7370-8
- Mioche, Philippe; Roux, Jacques (1988), Henri Malcor : Un héritier des maîtres de forge (in French), Paris: Editions du CNRS
- Sinanoglou, Ioannis (April 1988), "Review: Capitalism at War: Industrial Policy and Bureaucracy in France, 1914-1918 by John F. Godfrey", French Politics and Society, 6 (2), Berghahn Books, JSTOR 42844895
- Vinen, Richard (2002-08-08), The Politics of French Business 1936-1945, Cambridge University Press, ISBN 978-0-521-52240-3
- "Wendel", Section Genealogique, Association Artistique de la Banque de France, archived from the original on 2016-03-03
