= Wendel (group) =

French investment company

Wendel S.E.
- Type: Societas Europaea
- Traded as: Euronext Paris: MF; CAC Mid 60 Component
- ISIN: FR0000121204
- Industry: Investments
- Founded: 1704; 322 years ago
- Founder: Jean-Martin Wendel
- Headquarters: Paris, France
- Key people: Laurent Mignon (CEO); David Darmon (Deputy CEO)
- Owner: De Wendel family (39.3%)
- Number of employees: c. 100 (2018)
- Website: wendelgroup.com

Wendel is a French investment company. The company is managed by Laurent Mignon, Group CEO, and David Darmon, Group Deputy CEO. Since July 2018, the chairman of the supervisory board is Nicolas ver Hulst.

== Shareholders ==
The Wendel family maintains a large holding in the company. The family shareholders are grouped in Wendel-Participations SE, which owns 39.3% of Wendel's share capital. Wendel-Participations SE is owned by c. 1,200 members of the Wendel family and legal entities. The Wendel family is represented by six members of the supervisory board. This long-term shareholding structure enables Wendel to focus on value creation and on the long-term growth of its investments.

Its main shareholders, as of December 31, 2020, are:

- Wendel Participations SE: 39.3%
- Institutional investors: 37.7%
- Individual Shareholders: 18.8%
- Employees, corporate officers and others: 2.3%
- Treasury shares: 2.0%

== Subsidiaries and participations ==
Wendel is the reference shareholder of the following main companies:

- Acams
- Bureau Veritas
- Crisis Prevention Institute
- Globeducate
- IHS Towers
- IK Partners
- Scalian
- Stahl
- Tarkett

== Governance ==
=== Supervisory Board ===
- Nicolas ver Hulst, chairman
- Gervais Pellisser, vice-chairman
- Franca Bertagnin Benetton
- Bénédicte Coste
- Harper Mates
- François de Mitry
- Priscilla de Moustier
- Sophie Tomasi Parise
- Guylaine Saucier
- Jacqueline Tammenoms Bakker
- Thomas de Villeneuve
- Humbert de Wendel

=== Executive Board ===
- Laurent Mignon, Group CEO
- David Darmon, Group Deputy CEO

== News ==
In October 2019, Wendel signed an agreement to acquire U.S. company Crisis Prevention Institute (CPI) from San Francisco-based FFL Partners in a deal with an enterprise value of $910 million.

In April 2014, Wendel confirmed that the acquisition of Clariant's Leather Services division by Stahl has been completed. In exchange for the sale of its assets to Stahl, Clariant received 23% of the shares of Stahl and a cash payment of €74 million. Wendel remains the principal shareholder of Stahl, with c.70% of the group's capital.

In April 2014, Wendel increases its total investment in IHS to $475 million.

In December 2013, Wendel realized its first investment in Japan, through Oranje Nassau Développement, with the acquisition of Nippon Oil Pump Co., Ltd. (NOP). Wendel has invested ¥3,2bn (c.€24M), subject to price adjustments, and holds 98% of the company, alongside management.

In November 2013, Wendel pursues its strategy of investment in Africa, becoming a shareholder of the pan-African group Saham, based in Morocco and majority-held by its founder and CEO, Moulay Hafid Elalamy. Wendel intends to support Saham in its future, long-term growth and development.

In July 2013, Wendel increases it investment in IHS Holding to $276 million.

In June 2013, after 11 years as reference shareholder, Wendel completes the successful sale of its remaining stake in Legrand.

In April 2013, the rating agency Standard & Poor's raised its long-term rating on Wendel from "BB" to "BB+", with stable outlook.

In April 2012, after obtaining the necessary authorizations, Wendel sold Deutsch to the industrial group TE Connectivity.

In March 2012, Frédéric Mitterrand, Minister of Culture, awarded Wendel with the distinction of Great Patron of Culture. This distinction acknowledges its commitment to arts and in particular to the Centre Pompidou-Metz.

In July 2011, Wendel announced the acquisition of Mecatherm, the world leader in industrial bakery equipment.

In July 2011, the rating agency Standard & Poor's revised from "stable" to "positive." Wendel's "BB−" credit rating after the company improved its financial profile, including its "loan to value" ratio.

In June 2011, Wendel became reference shareholder of the Swiss technology company Exceet Group AG, via the investment structure Helikos.

In May 2011, Wendel and Saint-Gobain established the principles and objectives of their long-term cooperation.

In March 2011, Wendel bought the car rental specialist Parcours for €107m.

Shareholder of Stallergenes since 1993, Wendel sold its shares (46%) of the world leader in immunotherapy treatment for allergic respiratory diseases, to Ares Life Sciences in November 2010.

In May 2010, Wendel became the founding sponsor of the Centre Pompidou-Metz.

In June 2008, Sophie Boegner, Ernest-Antoine Seillière's cousin, denounced the conditions through which 15 Wendel managers invested in 4.7% of the company's stock in May 2007. In August 2011, the public prosecutor dismissed the case. In a sequence of dismissal, Judge Renaud Van Ruymbeke pronounced which if a leaders of Wendel completed “significant gains” in reorder of a collateral Wendel, “this actuality alone can not concede a characterization of injustice of association assets”. The public prosecutor had previously closed the "misappropriation of funds and concealment" case, deeming that no penal qualification resulted from the case, given the contradictory elements transmitted by the Autorité des marchés financiers and given the results of an internal investigation.

In May 2008, Wendel sold Editis to the Spanish group Planeta.

In October 2007, the initial public offering of Bureau Veritas brought 1.2 billion euros. Wendel has stayed the majority shareholder with 63%.

In September 2007, Wendel sold the totality of its 2.4% shares in Neuf Cegetel for €148M.

In September 2007, Wendel became the first shareholder of Saint-Gobain, a leader in construction materials, by exceeding 15%.
