= De Wendel family =

Industrialist family from the Lorraine region of France

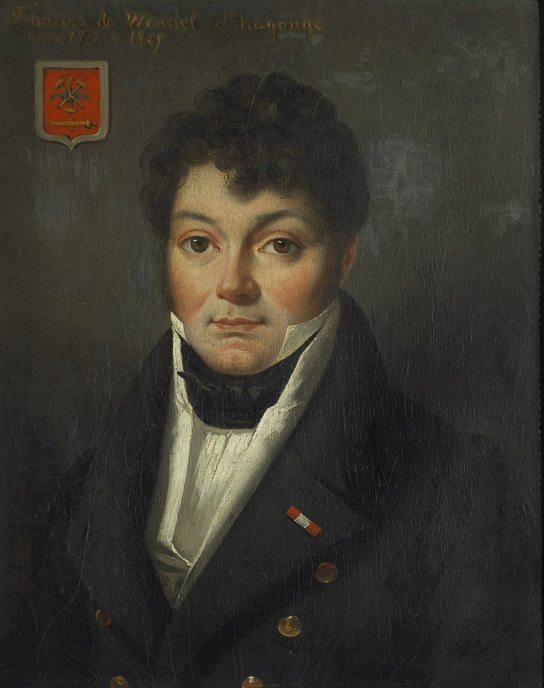
François de Wendel (1778–1825)

The Wendel family (French: de Wendel) is a family of steel-making industrialists from the Lorraine region of France. During the 19th and 20th centuries, the family gained both industrial and political power. As a result, the family also attracted controversy as an icon of French capitalism. Following the nationalization of the French steel industry in 1978, the family formed a successful investment company (Wendel Investissement). The family owns a significant stake in Wendel S.A.

== History ==
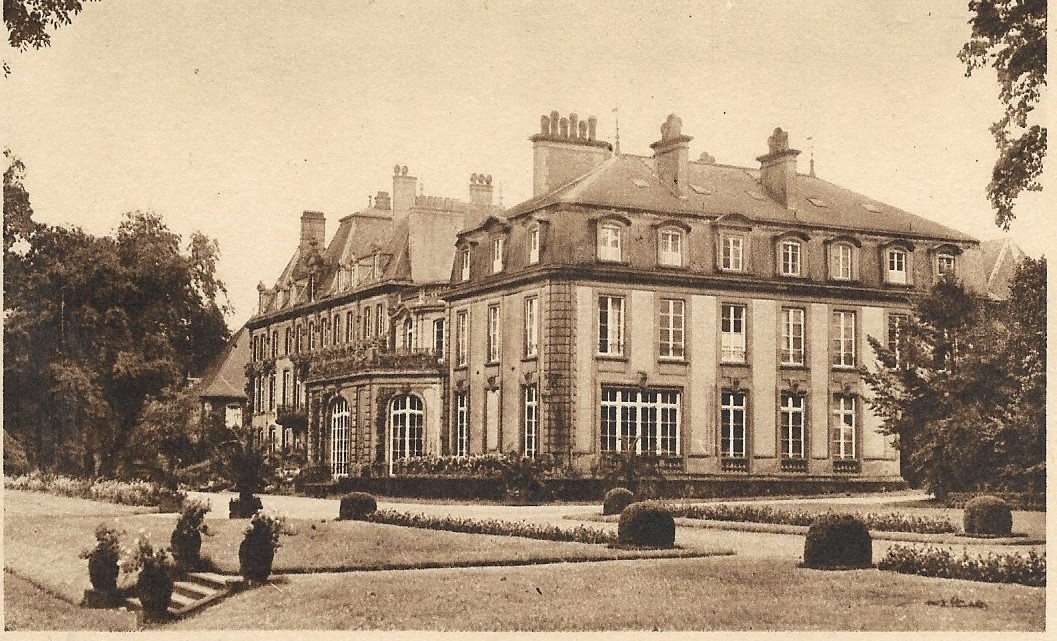
Château d'Hayange vers 1950

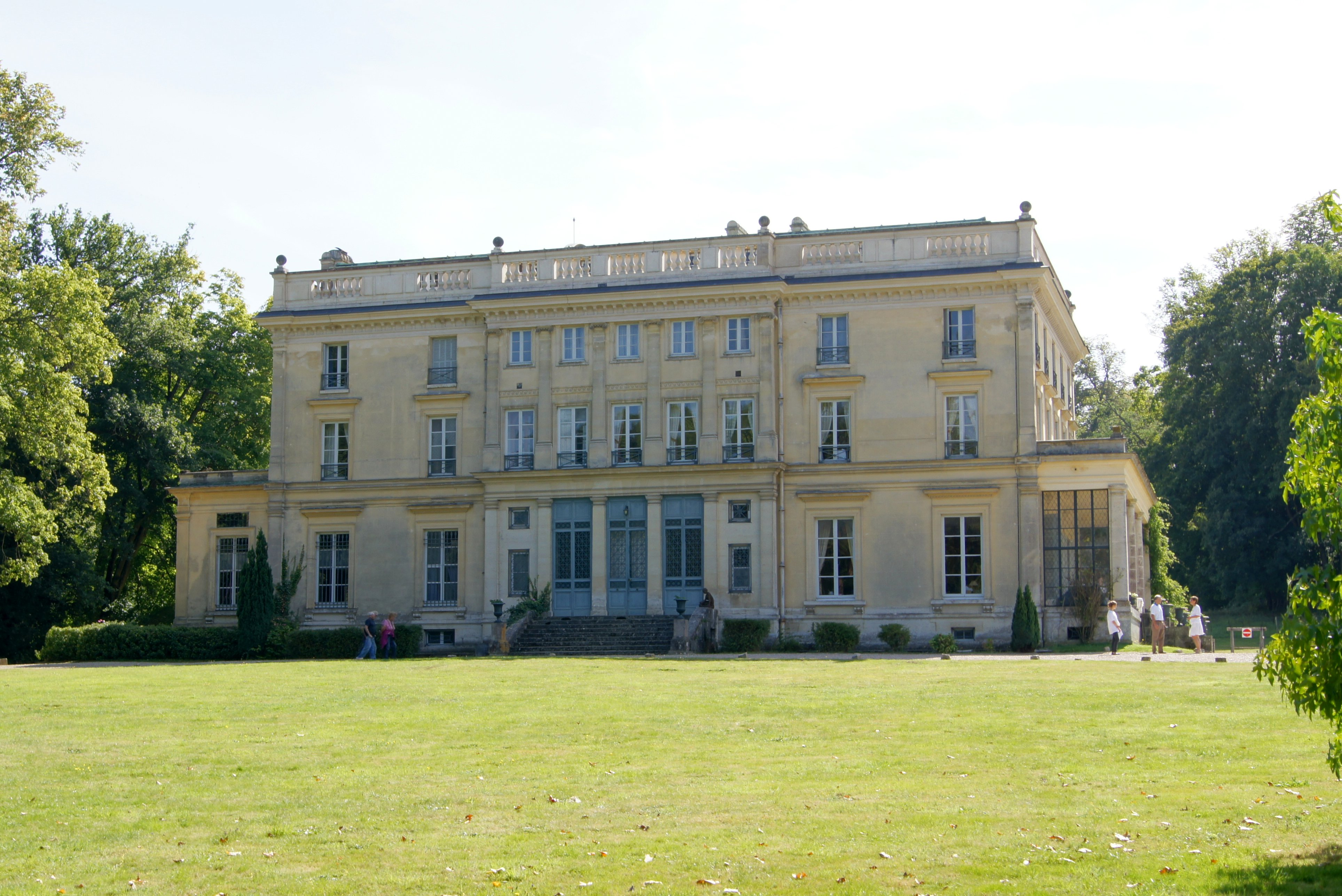
Château de Vaugien

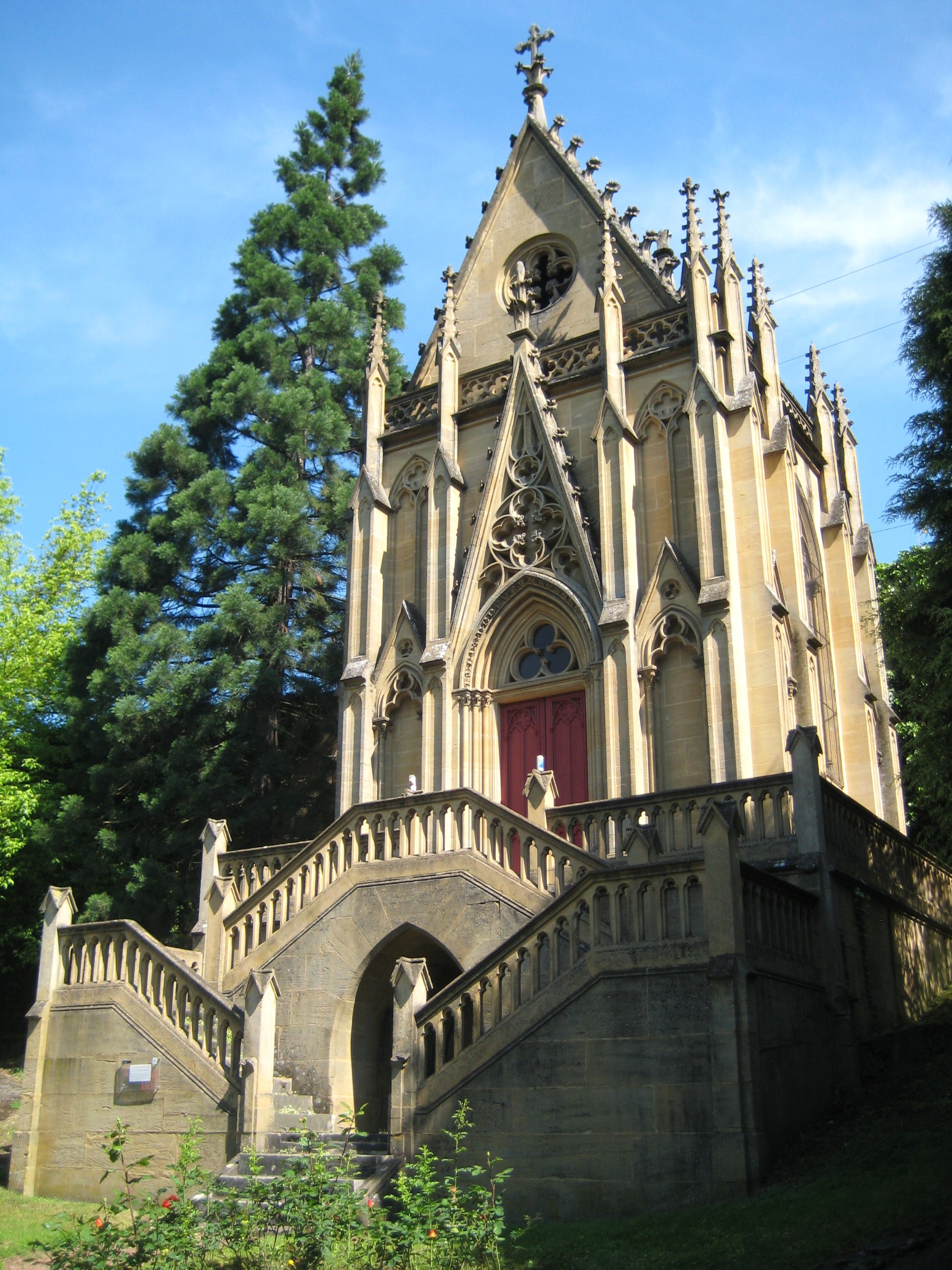
Funerary chapel of the family in Hayange

=== Origins ===
The first record of the family is of Jean Wendel, who seems to have lived in Bruges at the end of the 16th century. He married Marie de Wanderve. They settled in Koblenz. Their son Jean-Georges Wendel was born on 18 October 1605 in Koblenz, married Marguerite de Hammerstein and became colonel of a regiment of Cravattes (Croatians) under the Emperor Ferdinand III. His son Christian Wendel was born on 23 April 1636 in Koblenz, and became a lieutenant in the army of Charles IV, Duke of Lorraine. In 1656 he married Dorothea Agnes Jacob, and in 1660 remarried, to Claire Saurfeld who brought him property in Lorraine (the fief of Longlaville). They had six daughters and three sons. The sons were Francois Wendel, who died on 23 February 1742 without heirs, Jean-Martin Wendel (1665-1737), who founded the industrial fortune of the family, and Jean-Baptiste Wendel, an advocate at the Parliament of Metz in 1721.

=== Early industrialists ===
Jean-Martin Wendel was born on 22 February 1665 in Longlaville, a domain that was part of his mother's dowry. He married Anne-Marie Meyer around 1700. On 26 March 1704 he paid 9,621 livres for the La Comte (La Rodolphe) factories at Hayange. Exploiting local supplies of iron and wood, Wendel and his son Charles built Hayange into the largest iron enterprise in Lorraine in the eighteenth century. He bought the landed estate of Hayange from the King of France, with the rights of middle and low justices. In 1730 he bought the position of King's Counselor in the Chancellery of the Parliament of Metz. He was confirmed in his nobility by Leopold, Duke of Lorraine, by letters patent dated 17 February 1727 in Lunéville in confirmation of a title of nobility which could not otherwise be proved since the titles had been "lost in the misfortune of war". He died on 25 June 1737.

Jean-Martin Wendel's first two sons died young. His third son (and fifth child) was Charles de Wendel, born on 19 February 1708 in Ottange. He married Marguerite d'Hausen on 10 May 1739 in Sarreguemines, daughter of the Receiver of Finances of Lorraine. Charles died on 15 July 1784, and Marguerite died on 4 January 1801. Their son Ignace-François de Wendel was born on 23 September 1741 in Thionville. On 12 May 1772 he married Françoise Cécile du Tertre (b. 1749), daughter of the president of the Parliament of Metz. In 1779 he bought the Indret forge. In 1781 Ignace and the English steelmaker William Wilkinson founded the Le Creusot company, which was taken by the Schneider family in 1836. This was France's most technologically advanced forge. Igance's wife died in 1783.

=== French Revolution ===
In 1793 Ignace emigrated with his sons and died on 2 March 1795 in Saxony, intoxicated with opium. His eldest son was Charles Antoine de Wendel, born on 23 March 1774 in Metz, who became a captain in the Régiment de Rohan of the counter-revolutionary Armée des Émigrés. He died on 8 November 1832 at Strasbourg, without heirs. Ignace's second son was Antoine Louis de Wendel, born on 3 January 1776 in Metz, who became a lieutenant in the Régiment de Rohan. He died in 1828 without heirs. His third son, who would revive the family fortunes, was François de Wendel, born in Charleville on 19 February 1778.

Following the death of Charles de Wendel in 1784, his widow kept the enterprise going during the early years of the revolution until she was imprisoned and her grandson was guillotined. During this time many members of the de Wendel family emigrated. The Revolutionary government confiscated Hayange in January 1794. When Napoleon offered an amnesty to émigrés in 1803, François de Wendel, son of Ignace, returned from exile.

=== After the Revolution ===
On 16 February 1804 François de Wendel married his cousin Françoise Joséphine de Fischer de Dicourt (1784–1872). François became Mayor of Hayange on 2 January 1807, counsellor general on 28 August 1808 and Deputy for Moselle on 30 August 1815, sitting in the ranks of moderate royalists. He died in Metz on 13 March 1825. He rebuilt and modernized the furnaces and on his death in 1825, the Wendel concern was the third largest iron enterprise in France.

François's daughter Marguerite Joséphine (1804–51) married Baron Théodore Charles Constant de Gargan (1791-1853). His eldest son Victor François, known as Franclet (1807–50) married Marie Charlotte Octavie Pauline de Roziere (1810–90) and their daughter Pauline de Wendel married Viscount Albert de Curel. They had four daughters. His second son, Charles de Wendel was born on 13 December 1809 in Metz. Charles de Wendel became a steelmaster and Deputy for Moselle. On 29 May 1843 he married Jeanne Marie de Pechpeyrou-Comminges de Guitaut. During the metallurgy slump of 1847–50 he was assisted by the Bank of France, which he fully repaid in 1851. He died on 15 April 1870 in Paris. Charles and his brother-in-law Theodore de Gargan greatly expanded operations at Hayange and Moyeuvre in the 1840s and 1850s. Moreover, both plants were connected by rail to the company's coal mines and coke furnaces at Stiring-Wendel and at Seraing in Belgium thereby alleviating a chronic shortage of coal and coke. In 1870, Wendel et Cie was the largest iron company in France, employing some 7,000 workers and producing 134,500 tons of pig iron and 112,500 tons of iron a year.

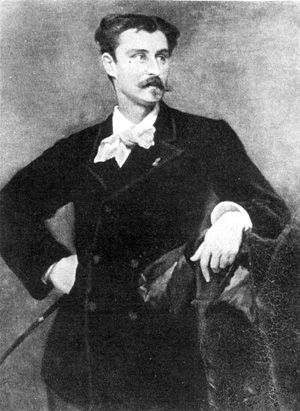
Robert de Wendel (1847–1903)

Charles had two sons, Henri de Wendel (1844–1906) and Robert de Wendel (1847–1903). Henri de Wendel was born on 24 March 1844 in Hayange, and became an engineer and steelmaker. Lorraine and the de Wendel factories became part of Germany on 1 March 1871. Henri created Les Petits-Fils de Francois de Wendel et Cie. (PFFW) in 1871 to control the Wendel family's steel operations in Lorraine. Wendel et Cie controlled the operations in France. On 4 July 1872 he married Berthe Henriette Marie de Corbel de Vaulserre (1849-1918). He died on 10 October 1906 in the Château de Vaugien, near Paris. Charles's second son Robert de Wendel was born on 19 May 1847 and became a steelmaker. He died on 26 August 1903 after falling from a horse.

Lorraine was annexed by Germany from 1870 to 1918, disrupting the operations. During this period, Henri de Wendel (1844–1906) acquired the process invented by the British engineers Thomas and Gichrist to produce steel. Wishing to own a factory in France, the Wendels, associated with the Schneiders and the Seillière bank, founded the Jœuf factory in 1882.

=== Final years ===
Henri had three sons, François de Wendel (1874–1949), Humbert de Wendel (1876–1954) and Maurice de Wendel (1879–1961). Henri's three sons were running the company when the enterprise was at its peak before the Second World War began. The Wendels were expelled from Lorraine by the Germans and the factories confiscated. At the end of the war, the industrial situation changed. In 1946, coal mines were nationalised; the last historical great master of forges, François II de Wendel, died in 1949. The company, still directed by the family, suffered, in 1978, the great turmoil that weakened European steel-making and the entire de Wendel empire was nationalised without indemnity. Whatever remained of the empire was then converted into a successful investment company under Ernest-Antoine Seillière, who later became chairman of MEDEF, the French association of business employers.

== Sources ==
- "François de Wendel (1874–1949)", Annales des Mines, CGE
- Musée d'Orsay, The De Wendel Company, Three Centuries of Industry in Lorraine (1704-2004), archived from the original on 13 March 2012
- Smith, Michael Stephen (2006), The Emergence of Modern Business Enterprise in France, 1800-1930, Harvard University Press, ISBN 0-674-01939-3
- "Wendel", Section Genealogique, Association Artistique de la Banque de France, archived from the original on 2016-03-03
