= Hermann Röchling =

German steel industrialist (1872–1955)

- Born: 12 November 1872; Völklingen
- Died: 24 August 1955 (aged 82); Mannheim
- Occupation: Steel manufacturer

Hermann Röchling (12 November 1872 – 24 August 1955) was a German steel manufacturer in the regions of Saar (Germany) and Lorraine (France) in the 20th century. An early supporter of Nazism, he went on to play a major role in the German war economy during World War II and was later convicted of crimes against humanity for the use of forced labor.

After World War I (1914–18) he was accused of the war crime of destroying French factories. Although he was later acquitted, his French property was never returned, and he became deeply hostile to France.

He was a Pan-German nationalist and strongly antisemitic. After the accession of Adolf Hitler he became an influential member of the Nazi Party. During World War II (1939–45) he was made responsible for coordination of the iron and steel industry in occupied Lorraine, and later in the whole of Germany and the occupied territories. He used prisoners of war for forced labor in the steel works. After the war he was tried and convicted for human rights violations, although as an old man he was released before serving his full term.

== Early years (1872–1914) ==
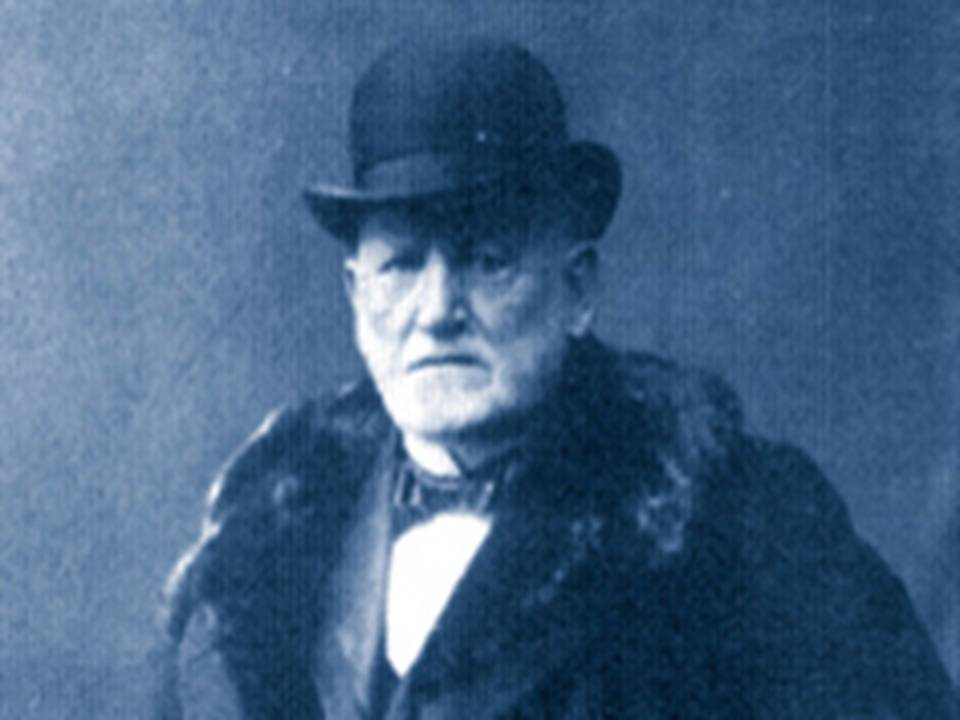
Carl Röchling, Hermann's father

Hermann Röchling was born on 12 November 1872 in Saarbrücken and baptized on 28 December 1872 in Alt-Saarbrücken. His parents were Carl Röchling (1827–1910), a major industrialist, and Alwine Vopelius (1837–1918). In 1891 he passed his Reifeprüfung at the Ludwigs Gymnasium in Saarbrücken. Hermann Röchling received practical training at the Hüttenwerken in Peine and at the Ilseder Hütte. He studied at the University of Heidelberg and the Technische Hochschule in Charlottenburg (now Technische Universität Berlin). He returned to Völklingen in October 1895 where he received further practical training. He served for one year in 7th Dragoon Regiment in Saarbrücken. In the spring of 1897 he went on a study trip to North America.

Carl Röchling, Hermann's father, was head of what would become the Röchling Group. By 1896 Carl Röchling and his children owned more than 50% of the company. Hermann Röchling was Carl Röchling's seventh son, but due to his technical and commercial talent became the patriarch of the family firm. He was supported by a number of brothers and cousins. In August 1897 Hermann Röchling oversaw construction of a new Carlshütte kiln plant in Diedenhofen (Thionville) in Lorraine. (Note: Diedenhofen (Thionville) was in Lorraine, which had passed to Germany after the Franco-Prussian War of 1870, and would return to France in 1945.) In 1898 he took over management of the Völklingen Ironworks (Völklinger Hütte). On 10 August 1899 in Metz he married Theodora Müller (1878–1946). They had two children, Ellenruth (1900–1977), and Carl Theodor (1902–44).

The Völklinger iron and steel mill is only a few kilometers from the border with France, in a region where international borders have often been disputed, and became an important military-industrial complex. In 1900 the iron works employed 6,000 people. Hermann Röchling directed the plant in Thionville until 1905, when his brother Robert took over. In 1907 Hermann Röchling became the director of the Völklingen Ironworks. Carl Röchling died in Saarbrücken in 1910. Hermann Röchling continued to build his stake in the company. He also supported the Evangelical Church and various social organizations and charities. The Röchlings were known for treating their employees well. Hermann Röchling was paternalistic, concerned about the health of the workers and their wives and children. He built a hospital for the ironworks.

Locations in Northeast France / Southwest Germany

== World War I (1914–18) ==
From 1914 to 1915 Hermann Röchling was Rittmeister of the 7th Dragoon Regiment. He was a nationalist, and during World War I (1914–18) he advocated westward expansion of the German Reich. The Völklingen Ironworks provided 90% of the special steel used for army helmets. The Völklingen plant also made two sizes of shells for the German army and navy. In 1918 Herrmann Röchling was appointed a Royal Prussian "Kommerzienrat". He and his cousin Robert were charged with destroying several factories in the northeast of France when they were evacuated by German troops. His efficiency in carrying out the order later caused much trouble.

== Inter-War period (1918–39) ==
After the war, Hermann Röchling was a member of the armistice commission. The firm resumed steel manufacture. The higher quality steel was molten in Röchling Rodenhauser electric furnaces, which Röchling had helped design, and was used for tools, cutlery and surgical instruments. The company also made steel for construction. The coal was mined locally, while iron ore was imported from Lorraine, France.

In 1919 France accused the brothers Robert and Hermann Röchling of the war crimes of serious theft and damage. On 23 December 1919 the council of war in Amiens condemned them to 10 years imprisonment, a 10 million franc fine and exile from Saarland. The family's assets in France were seized, with nominal compensation of about 5% of the value. Hermann Röchling, who was living in Heidelberg, escaped imprisonment. Röchling devoted himself to intense anti-French propaganda while in Heidelberg. The judgement was annulled in cassation, and a new trial was started by the council of war of Nancy. The Röchlings argued that since they had simply executed orders given by the German High Command they should not be prosecuted, and on 12 October 1920 an order ruled in their favour. However, Hermann could not obtain a pardon from the French government until 18 May 1942, which increased his resentment of France. He was able to return to the Saar after the sentence was repealed.

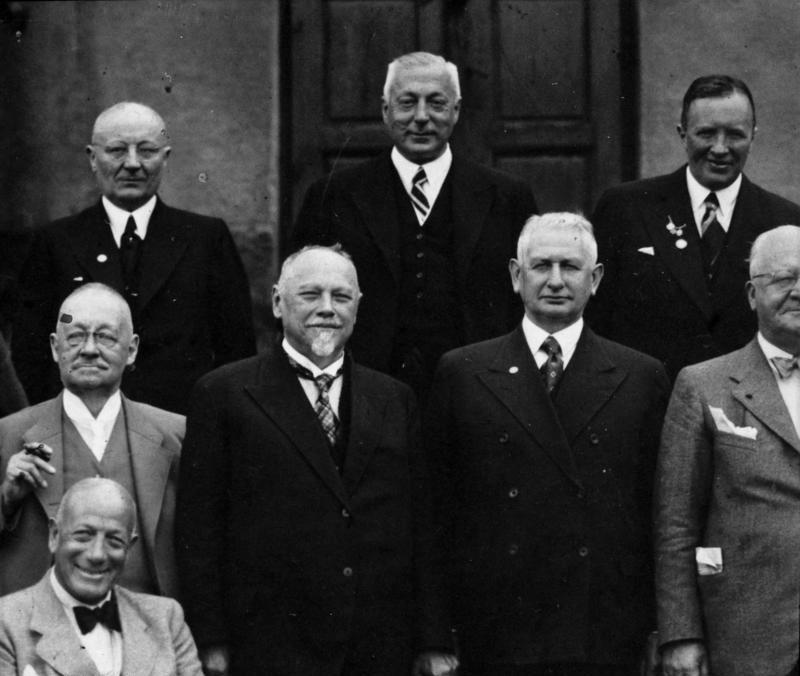
German industrialists in 1937: Rear: Terberger, Raabe, Krugmann; Front: Friedrich Flick, Eugen Böhringer, Konsul Stein; Seated: Robert Röchling, Hermann's brother

In 1920 Hermann Röchling founded the Röchling-Buderus steelworks in Wetzlar. In 1922 he was awarded an honorary doctorate by the Heidelberg University. During the occupation of the Saar from 1922 to 1935 Hermann Röchling was an elected representative of the people on the Advisory Council of the Saar Territory, first representing the Liberale Volkspartei, then after this party joined with the Democrats representing the Deutsche-Saarländische Volkspartei. Röchling welcomed the arrival of Hitler in power, which promised a triumph of his Pan-German ideas. He was glad to see the Treaty of Versailles dismantled and welcomed a war that would allow him to take final revenge on France.

Röchling met Adolf Hitler in 1933 and promoted formation of the "German Front" (Note: The "German Front" in the Saar was an alliance between the Nazis and Catholics formed to ensure that the plebiscite resulted in a vote to return to Germany, opposed to the "United Front" of the Communists and Social Democrats, which wanted to retain League of Nations status. The German Front boycotted and beat up their opponents. In the event, there was a 90.3% vote in favor of return to Germany.) in the Saar at Hitler's suggestion. After the expiry of the League of Nations mandate over the Saar in 1935, Hermann Röchling committed himself to the return of Saarland to Germany. Röchling was violently antisemitic, and when the Nazis temporarily reduced their attacks on Jews before the January 1935 plebiscite on the return he protested that the Saar risked turning into a "Jewish nature reserve". Röchling joined the Nazi Party in 1935. In 1935 he was appointed to the Reich's Armament Advisory Board (Rustungsbeirat). Hermann Röchling was a confidant of Hitler, who valued his knowledge of industry. Röchling wrote several memoranda for Hitler. In his "Thoughts on the Preparation for the War and Its Implementation" in August 1936 he urged Hitler to declare war on the Soviet Union.

As of 1936 Hermann Röchling and his two children, Karl Theodor (1902–1944) and Ellenruth (1900–1977), owned 18% of the company shares. Röchling also sat on the boards on many mining companies. He was a senator of the Kaiser Wilhelm Society. On 30 January 1938 Hermann Röchling was appointed a military economist by Hermann Göring (1893–1946). As Wehrwirtschaftsführer (defense economy leader) he headed the "South West District of the steel industry economic grouping".

== World War II (1939–45) ==
After the defeat of France Röchling was made appointed General Manager of Iron and Steel for the Lorraine and Meurthe-de-Moselle regions, excluding Longwy, on 1 July 1940, and held this post until 1942. In a letter to Hitler of 15 July 1940 Röchling advocated annexation of Moselle and Meurthe-et-Moselle to Germany. French elements would be expelled and Germans introduced, mainly from the Saar. Göring decreed that the Moselle factories were to be divided into three groups: those restored to their former owners, those handed to the Reichswerke Hermann Göring, and those handed over to Friedrich Flick A.G.. Röchling protested strongly but was overruled. For example, the Wendel steelworks in Lorraine had been occupied by German troops on 16 June 1940. François and Humbert de Wendel were given permits to travel to Hayange, where they were shown an authorization by Göring on 12 July 1940 for Röchling to take control of the works. The Wendels were forced to leave Lorraine on 48 hours notice. Röchling pledged to destroy the Wendel family interests. He wanted to separate the Wendel factories at Hayange, Moyeuvre-Grande and Jœuf, and annex the Hayange plant to his Carlshütte in Thionville. However, in December 1940 Paul Raabe warned him that in the end Göring would assign the spoils of the Wendel family to his own firm.

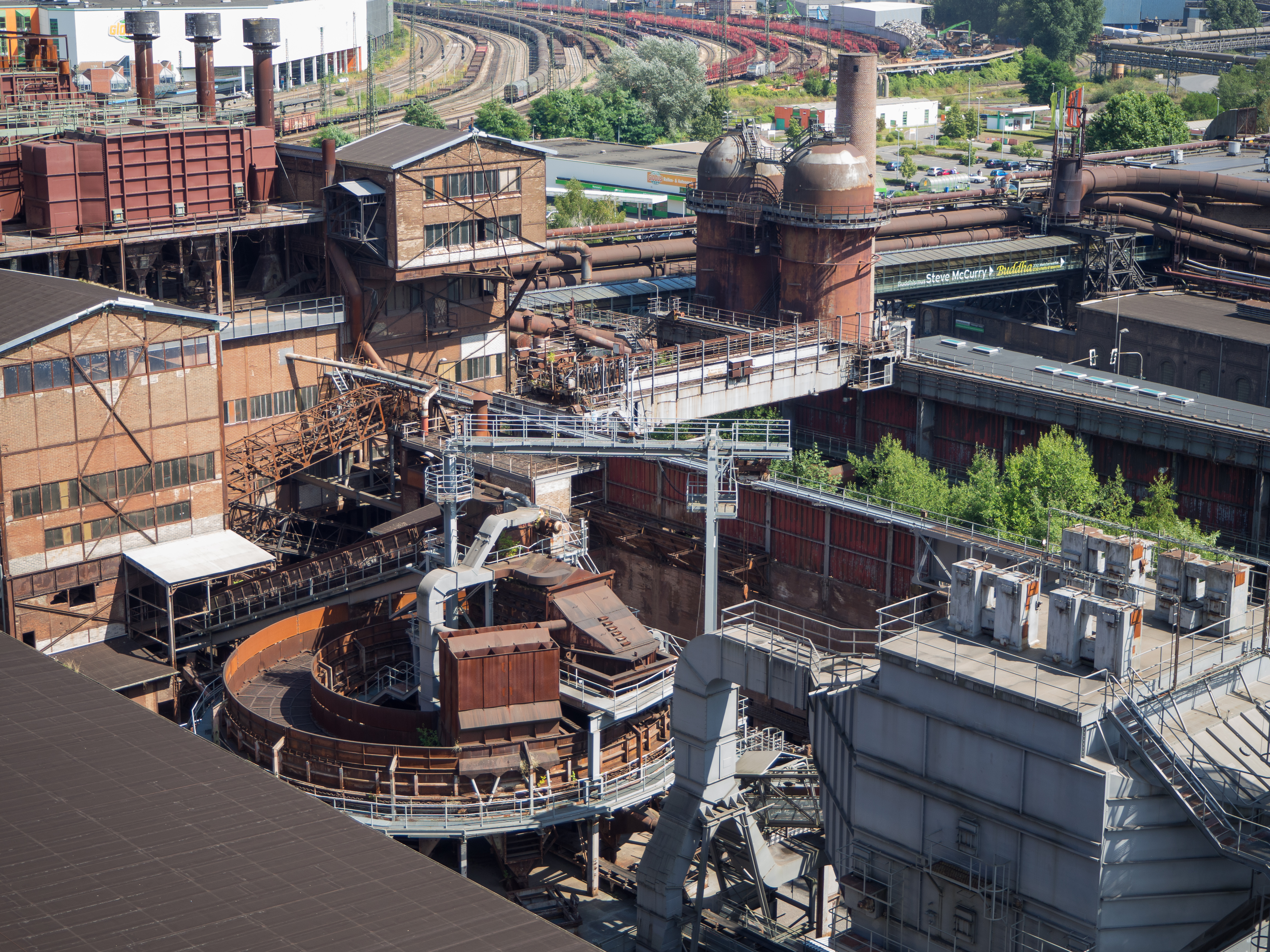
Völklingen Ironworks, now a UNESCO World Heritage Site

After Göring's allocation of the industrial plants, in January 1941 Hermann Röchling was relieved of control in Moselle, retaining only Meurthe-et-Moselle. In 1941 he became president of the Metz Chamber of Industry and Commerce. By the spring of 1942 Röchling saw the struggle in Russia as a trial between Capitalism and Communism, and was concerned at the success of the Soviets in supplying aircraft and tanks to their forces. He supported the antisemitic and imperialist policies of the Nazis, but shared with Speer a deep concern over the Nazi's confused attacks on "plutocrats". He disagreed with the state-controlled approach of the Reichswerke Hermann Göring and wanted to prove that private enterprise, left to organize itself without interference and allowed to make profits, was the best way to supply the armed forces with what they needed.

In March 1942 Röchling wrote to Hitler, "The steel industry of Lorraine and Luxembourg is not being exploited at even 30 percent of capacity, that of Meurthe-et-Moselle and Longwy at not even 20 percent, and that of Belgium-North France at only 30 percent. In 1942 Speer proposed to form a Reich Iron Association (RVE) to cut through the confusion of competing interests in the iron and steel industry, controlling everything from raw material to sales, and proposed Albert Vögler of United Steel as head. However, Hitler preferred Röchling, and on 29 May 1942 Speer appointed him chairman of the RVE. Röchling had the power to do everything necessary to double production of steel. He ordered the western European steel manufacturers to accept his orders without question, even if this led them to ruin. They could not comply except in the short term because of the shortage of coal.

On 18 June 1942 Röchling was also given charge of the iron and steel industry in the occupied territories at the recommendation of Goering. Röchling, Alfried Krupp and Walter Rohland now had almost absolute power over heavy industry. The Reich Iron Association held its first presidium meeting in August 1942, attended by Röchling, Krupp, Rohland, Friedrich Flick, Wilhelm Zangen, Paul Pleiger and Alfred Pott as well as representatives from the German Labour Front and from Saxony and Austria. On his 70th birthday on 12 November 1942, Röchling received the Adlerschild des Deutschen Reiches (Eagle Shield of the German Reich), a reward for the civil personalities of the Third Reich. Röchling's crash program drained industrial reserves of coal, and in 1943 the problem worsened as coal miners went on strike, shortages developed in mining material such as pit props, and Allied bombing raids increased in preparation for the landings in Normandy. Speer was unable to revive industrial production.

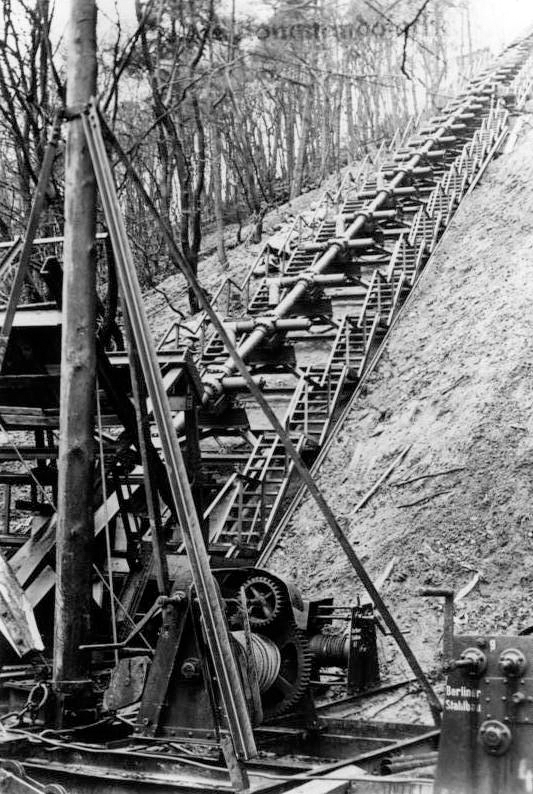
The prototype V-3 cannon at Laatzig, Germany (now Poland) in 1942

The concept of the V-3 cannon, a 416 feet (127 m) gun barrel that would fire a 9 feet (2.7 m) long dart-shaped shell, originated with August Coenders, a machine gun engineer and developer of the Röchling shell who worked for Hermann Roechling. The idea was to reduce London to rubble by continuous rapid fire of these shells. Work on the V3 started in 1942 and in 1943 Roechling persuaded Speer to give the project his backing. A huge emplacement was built near Moyecques in the Pays de Calais using German workers, prisoners of war and slave labourers. Test firings in January 1944 were not promising and later that year the project was abandoned.

During the war the Röchlings used prisoners of war to work their steel mills, and both tolerated and encouraged inhumane conditions and harsh punishments. On 17 December 1944 Hermann Roechling's son Carl Theodor was assassinated in Völklingen. The military occupation of the Saar by American troops began on 20 March 1945.

== Post-World War II (1945–55) ==
After the World War II Röchling was interrogated during the Nuremberg trials in June 1945. In November 1946 he was arrested by the Allies, and in May 1947 was transferred to France. His trial at the International Military Court in Rastatt began on 16 February 1948 for crimes against humanity. In the same trial his cousin Ernst Röchling, his son-in-law Hans Lothar Gemmingen-Hornberg and two associates were tried. Among other things, Hermann Röchling was accused of urging Hitler to invade the Balkans so as to appropriate the Balkan enterprises. The indictment stated that, "[i]f the 'Directors of German Enterprises'... plead that they only attached themselves to Hitler in order to oppose communism or 'Social Democracy', there exists no doubt that the profound reason for their attitude can be sought in their desire, long before the coming of national socialism, to extend their undertakings beyond the frontiers of the Reich."

At his trial in Nuremberg in June 1946 Speer said that he and Hermann Röchling had resisted demands by Hitler to use violence in disciplining French labour and to abandon "humanitarian muddle-headedness" in dealing with saboteurs. Humbert de Wendell stated in an affidavit that he considered, "the defendant [to be] a pan-Germanist of the old school, who gave total support to Hitler because he saw in him a man capable of achieving the 'Deutschland über Alles!'. But [Röchling] did not swallow all the stupidity of the Nazi Party. ... He was a man of the Reichswehr [sic] but not the Gestapo." De Wendell said Röchling had resisted the expulsion of French personnel by Gauleiter Josef Bürckel, had stopped the Gestapo from placing their agents in the factories, had often intervened on behalf of French employees with the police and had appointed excellent German administrators.

A revised sentence of conviction was published on 2 July 1948. Hermann Röchling was sentenced to seven years in prison for crimes against humanity, and Gemmingen-Hornberg received a three year sentence. Ernst Röchling was acquitted. The Völklingen Ironworks was placed under sequestration by the French State after the June 1948 trial, but this did not give the French state legal ownership. After an appeal, on 25 January 1949 the Supreme Court of the French Military Government in the French Zone of Occupation acquitted Hermann Röchling of waging aggressive wars. (Note: Hermann Röchling was represented by Otto Kranzbühler before the French military court in Rastatt.) It made this ruling since the International Military Tribunal in Nuremberg had dismissed Speer from this charge. However, it sentenced him to ten years imprisonment for the other charges. The court also reversed the acquittal of Ernst Röchling and sentenced him to seven years imprisonment. All the property of the convicted men was confiscated and they lost their civil rights.

On 18 August 1951 Röchling was given a conditional discharge. He remarried on 20 August 1951 in Königsfeld, Swabia to Ruth Huesgen (1885–1973). In 1952 he received the Werner von Siemens Ring, one of the highest German honors awarded in the field of technical sciences. In 1953 he received the Rudolf-Diesel-Medaille. In April 1955 the French and German governments bought Völklingen from the Röchling family for 200 million Swiss francs. By this time he was viewed as something of a martyr in Saarland, since he had always treated his employees well, and it was rumoured that the government had cheated him.

Hermann Röchling died on 24 August 1955 in Mannheim. He was buried in the Röchling family vault in Alt-Saarbruecken. The Völklingen Ironworks was returned to the Röchling family in 1956. In 1956 a memorial was dedicated to Hermann Röchling in Völklingen, and the district of Hermann Röchling Heights in Völklingen was named after him. Due to his Nazi past, this was an ongoing source of controversy. The iron works was later made a UNESCO World Heritage Site. The genus of the extinct beetle Rochlingia hitleri was named after Hermann Röchling by P. Guthörl in 1934.

== Publications ==
- Hermann Röchling (1928), Die Zukunft des Saarbergbaues hängt von der Verbesserung der Frachtlage ab, Völkingen: Gebr. Hofer A.-G.
- Hermann Röchling (1932), Der Rückkauf der Saarkohlengruben, Köln: Rhein-Saar-Pressedienst
- Hermann Röchling (1934), Wir halten die Saar!, Berlin: Volk u. Reich Verl.
- Hermann Röchling (1955), Ein Unternehmer an der Saar, Köln: Dt. Industrieverl.-Ges.

== Sources ==
- "Alle Träger der Dieselmedaillen", Deutsches Institut für Erfindungswesen E.v. (in German), Deutsche Institut für Erfindungswesen
- Baars, Grietje (2013), "Capitalism's Victor's Justice? The Hidden Stories Behind the Prosecution of Industrialists Post-WWII", The Hidden Histories of War Crimes Trials, OUP Oxford, ISBN 978-0-19-967114-4
- Berenbaum, May (2010), "ICE Breakers" (PDF), American Entomologist, 56 (3): 132–133+ 185, doi:10.1093/ae/56.3.132, archived from the original (PDF) on 2015-07-24
- Burg, Peter (13 March 2013), Familie Röchling (1730-1987), Unternehmerfamilie (in German), Münster: LVR: Landschaftsverband Rheinland
- Cassese, Antonio, ed. (2009-01-22), "Röchling and others", The Oxford Companion to International Criminal Justice, OUP Oxford, ISBN 978-0-19-155344-8
- Clare, John D (2014), The Saar Plebsicite
- Eichholtz, Dietrich; Schumann, Wolfgang (1969), Anatomie des Krieges (in French), Berlin
- E. W. (December 1955), "Causes and Consequences of the Plebiscite in the Saar", The World Today, 11 (12), Royal Institute of International Affairs: 530–539, JSTOR 40392788
- Frei, Norbert (2010-06-01), Adenauer's Germany and the Nazi Past: The Politics of Amnesty and Integration, Columbia University Press, ISBN 978-0-231-50790-5
- Gérard, Pierre (January 1977), "Le Protectorat Industriel Allemand en Meurthe-et-moselle", Revue d'Histoire de la Deuxième Guerre Mondiale (in French), 27 (105, La Lorraine Pendant la Guerre), Presses Universitaires de France: 9–28, JSTOR 25728813
- Gillingham, John (2014-09-19), Industry and Politics in the Third Reich (RLE Nazi Germany & Holocaust): Ruhr Coal, Hitler and Europe, Routledge, ISBN 978-1-317-63418-8
- James, Harold (2009-06-30), Family Capitalism: Wendels, Haniels, Falcks, and the Continental European Model, Harvard University Press, ISBN 978-0-674-03909-4
- Kitchen, Martin (2015-11-28), Speer: Hitler's Architect, Yale University Press, ISBN 978-0-300-21600-4
- Klee, Ernst (2003), "Röchling, Hermann", Das Personenlexikon im Dritten Reich. Wer war was vor und nach 1945? (in German), Frankfurt: S. Fischer, ISBN 3-10-039309-0
- Long, Bronson (2015), No Easy Occupation: French Control of the German Saar, 1944–1957, Boydell & Brewer, ISBN 978-1-57113-915-3
- Mahony, Francis A. (15 June 1945), Interrogation of Hermann Röchling, Nuremberg, Germany: International Military Tribunal, archived from the original on August 8, 2017
- Mühlberger, Sarah (29 November 2012), "One German Town's Struggle with History", Der Spiegel
- Plisch, Uta, "Hermann Röchling", Saarland-Lese (in German)
- "Röchling Hermann", Saarländische Biografien (in German)
- Soyez, Dietrich (2009), "Europeanizing Industrial Heritage in Europe: Addressing its Transboundary and Dark Sides", Geographische Zeitschrift, 97 (1, European Heritage – In Europe and Beyond), Franz Steiner Verlag: 43–55, doi:10.25162/gz-2009-0004, JSTOR 25758632, S2CID 252448089
- Steguweit, Wolfgang (2000), "Der "Adlerschild des Deutschen Reiches"", Berlinische Monatsschrift (6), Edition Luisenstadt
- Taylor, Blaine (2010-09-09), Hitler's Engineers: Fritz Todt and Albert Speer – Master Builders of the Third Reich, Casemate, ISBN 978-1-935149-78-1
- The Röchlings, a family of entrepreneurs, Weltkulturerbe Völklinger Hütte
- Trueman, C N (21 April 2015), "V3", The History Learning Site
