= Marguerite de Wendel =

French industrialist

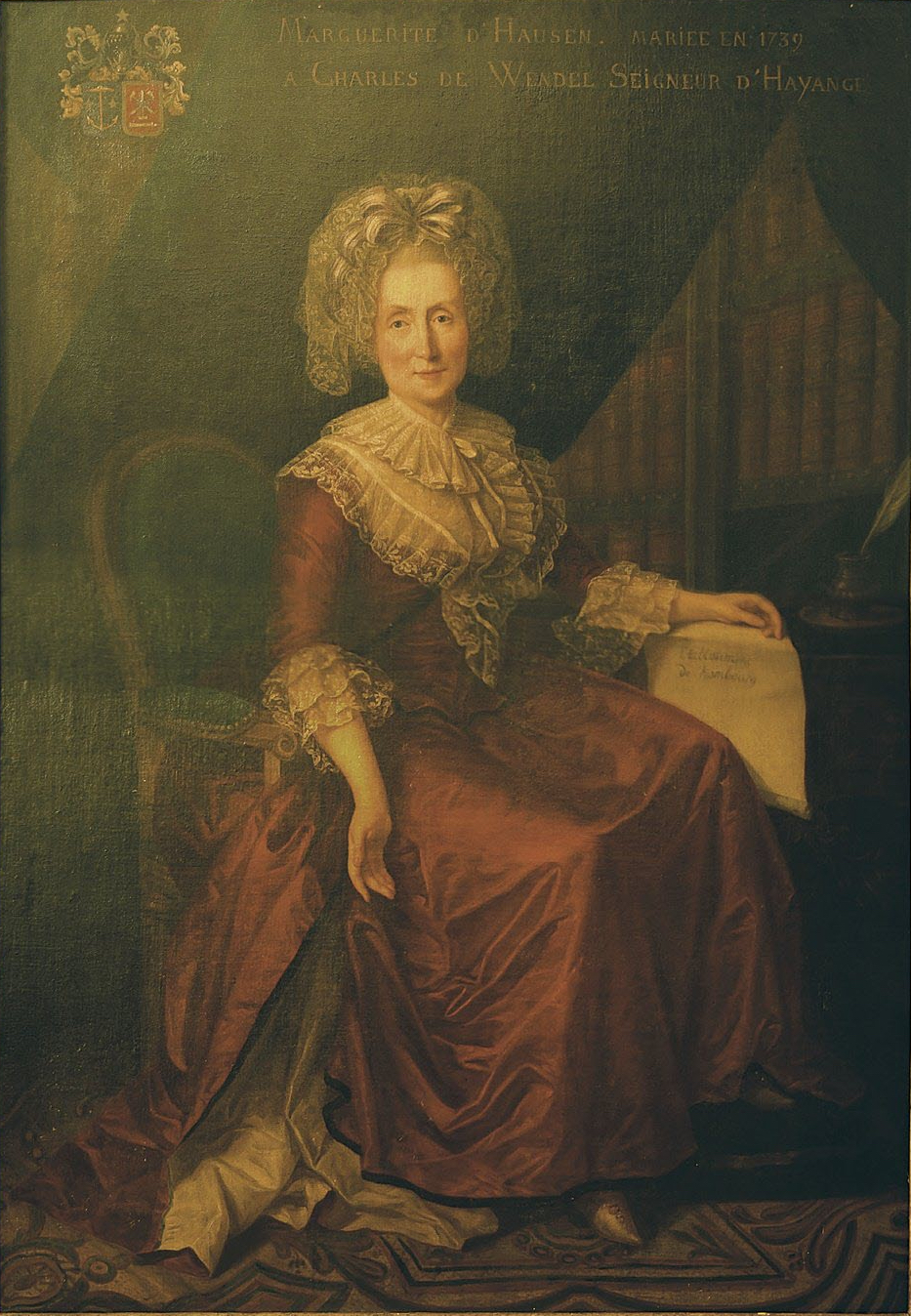

Marguerite d'Hausen (20 October 1720 – 4 January 1802), also called Marguerite de Wendel and Madame d'Hayange, was a French industrialist.

== Early life and education ==
Marguerite de Wendel was the daughter of Jean-Alexandre d'Hausen, Lord of Weidesheim, and Elisabeth Schrembgen[1],[2]. She was the sister of Anne-Elisabeth, who married François-Louis de Serre, advisor to the Duke of Lorraine, the former King of Poland Stanislas Leszczynski.

On 10 May 1739, she married Jean Charles de Wendel, Lord of Hayange in Sarreguemines. They had seven children, five of whom survived.

== Marriage and career ==
She was married to Jean Charles de Wendel (d. 1784), owner of the Wendel Iron works in Lorraine. She managed the iron works for her husband during his old age, and after his death for her sons, who preferred to tend to other businesses. The Wendel Iron works belonged to the most notable in France, as it stood for a large part of the French weapon industry, and she managed business contracts and negotiations with the government.

During the French revolution her sons and sons-in-law emigrated. During the Reign of Terror, she managed the contacts with the Robespierre government and was put under supervision by the government. Her grandson was executed, and she was eventually arrested and imprisoned and the iron works were confiscated by the state. She was released after the fall of Robespierre.
