= Camille Cavallier =

French industrialist (19 May 1854 – 10 June 1926)

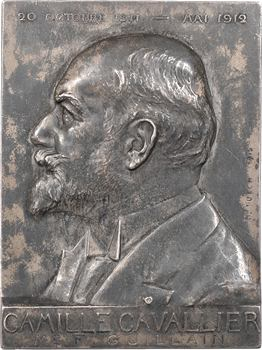
- Camille Cavallier by Denys Puech (1912)
- Born: 19 May 1854; Pont-à-Mousson, Meurthe-et-Moselle, France
- Died: 10 June 1926 (aged 72); Maxéville, Meurthe-et-Moselle, France
- Occupation: Iron maker

Camille Cavallier (19 May 1854 – 10 June 1926) was a French industrialist who directed the Pont-à-Mousson iron works in Lorraine in the first quarter of the 20th century, specializing in making cast iron pipes. He came from a poor family but obtained a good technical education and joined the iron maker as an employee in 1874. He rose rapidly through the ranks, and started to acquire shares. Soon after taking charge of the company he became the largest shareholder. He quadrupled production in the years leading up to World War I (1914–18). The company was devastated by the war, but Cavallier managed to bring production back up to prewar levels before his death.

== Early years ==
Location of Pont-à-Mousson

Camille Constant Cavallier was born on 19 May 1854 in Pont-à-Mousson, then in the Meurthe department. His parents were Jean Pierre Baptiste Cavallier (b. 1816) and Marguerite Sophie Martin (b. 1825). His father was a gamekeeper for the Eaux et Forêts and his mother was a cleaning lady whose customers included Xavier Rogé, head of the local Société de Pont-à-Mousson iron works. His sister Sophie later joined the Sœurs de la Charité de Saint Charles, and his brother Henri became a member of the board of directors of the Société de Pont-à-Mousson. For many years the family lived in the heart of the Bois-le-Prêtre, a forest about 5 kilometres (3.1 mi) from the center of the town. In October 1867 Camille was admitted as a day student to the Collège of Pont-à-Mousson, where he was an excellent student. In 1870 he was accepted by the École Nationale des Arts et Métiers in Châlons-sur-Marne. His education was interrupted by the Franco-Prussian War of 1870. He returned to the college for a few months after it reopened in the spring of 1871, then entered the École des Arts et Métiers in Châlons-sur-Marne on 15 October 1871. He graduated on 31 July 1874 as a medalist.

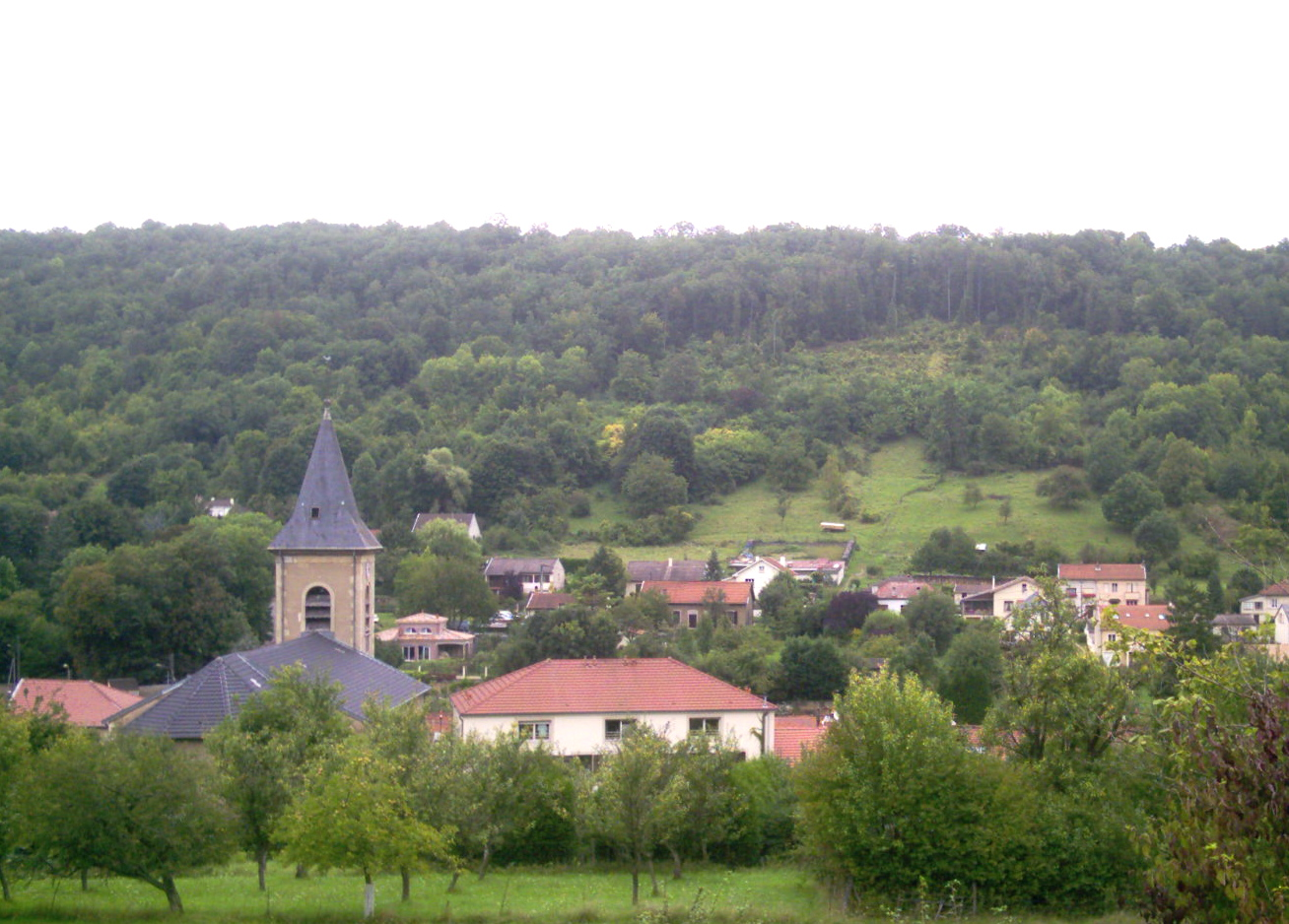
Marbache

The Pont-à-Mousson company had been created in 1856 by a group of Lorraine businessmen to operate the Marbache iron mine and to use the ore to manufacture cast iron. Xavier Rogé was the manager. In 1862 the enterprise was liquidated due to lack of sufficient capital to cover the high investment expenses. Rogé managed to raise capital in the Saarland and restart the business, selling most of its production to forges in the Ardennes and Champagne. In 1866 Rogé visited England and became aware of the new and promising market for cast-iron water pipes. He focused the company on pipe production, and found a ready market when cities began to make large investment in water supply after 1871. He adopted the English method of casting pipes in vertical rather than horizontal moulds.

Camille Cavallier joined the Société de Pont-à-Mousson on 1 August 1874. At this time the company consisted only of the factory at Pont-à-Mousson and the Marbache Iron Mine in the Nancy Basin. The blast furnaces produced only 50,000 tons per year, of which only 12,000 tons were made into moulded products, mainly cast iron pipes. Cavallier worked at the company for four months before being called up on 5 November 1874 for a year of military service, which he spent at Versailles in the 1st Regiment of Engineers. He was discharged as a second lieutenant of the reserve on 1 November 1875. He returned to the Société de Pont-à-Mousson on 2 November 1875, where he would work for the rest of his life.

== Growing responsibility (1875–99) ==
Camille Cavallier was first assigned to the "flat" foundry, then in 1876 to the "standing" foundry dedicated to making iron gutters and pipes. In 1877 Rogé gave him charge of the newly created commercial service. The job was to establish regional agencies, monitor demand, watch competitors and draw up quotations for tenders. He achieved excellent results in selling the cast iron pipes, and in 1883 won the tenders for the city of Paris. Rogé decided to groom Cavallier as his successor, and in the 1880s Cavallier became in effect the director-general, although Rogé retained that title. Cavallier did not limit himself to the commercial side, but played a large role in building up the company's mining assets. The company depended on the Marbache and Custines mines in the Nancy Basin, which delivered about 100,000 tons of ore annually. After surveys of the Millery region the company asked for a mining concession there, but was refused.

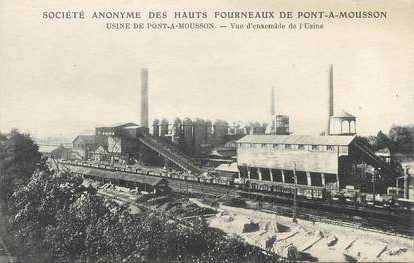
Factory at Pont-à-Mousson

Xavier Rogé began to investigate land around Auboué near the part of Lorraine that had been annexed by Germany, and on 1 December 1882 found the upper layers of the iron oxide formation of the Briey Basin. The survey then stopped, since the company undertaking it declared that the iron oxide formation had been completely crossed. Cavallier thought there could be lower layers, and obtained permission to continue the survey. In April 1883 a layer 4 metres (13 ft) thick was found, and on 11 August 1884 the Société de Pont-à-Mousson was granted the concession. The technicians said that it would be very difficult to pass through the overburden above the Auboué ore deposit due to the amount of water it contained. Cavallier decided to proceed anyway, using the freezing method to pass through the 100 metres (330 ft) aquifer layer, although this method had not been used for more than 60 metres (200 ft) in the past. The gamble succeeded.

The Pont-à-Mousson ironworks was transformed into a societe anonyme in 1886, with Xavier Rogé as its sole administrator. Rogé fell seriously ill in 1888 and depended more and more on Cavallier, then aged 34. On 17 August 1888 the company was granted the Vieux-Château concession, and on 25 May 1892 was granted the Belleville concession, both in the Nancy Basin. The company acquired the Malzéville and Grande Goutte mines in the Nancy Basin. In the 1890s the blast furnaces were fitted with Cowper regenerative heat exchangers. Until 1889 Cavallier had no shares in the company. In 1890 he acquired 100 shares, and in 1898 another 136. When Rogé was sick Cavallier acted as the effective head of the company, and on 15 January 1895 he was named deputy director.

About 1878 Camille Cavallier married Thérèse Julie Mangeot (c. 1855–1933). Their children were Charles (1879–1930) and Jeanne Marguerite Françoise (b. c. 1882). Around 1908 his daughter married Marcel Paul (1879–1946), who changed his name to Marcel Paul-Cavallier.

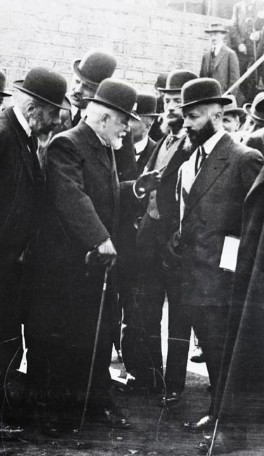
Camille Cavallier meeting union leaders in 1908

== Chief executive: Pre-war period (1899–1914) ==
On 31 January 1899 Camille Cavallier was made joint administrator, and became sole administrator when Rogé retired the next year. On 31 March 1899 Cavallier obtained the Mairy concession in the Briey Basin for the company. Since becoming head of the company Cavallier devoted a large part of his salary to buying shares in the company. In 1900, Cavallier held only 8% of the capital of Pont-à-Mousson, with 236 shares. By the time of the meeting of 9 January 1901 he had become the largest shareholder with 816 shares, or 28%, due to acquisition of the shares of Xavier Rogé. By 1912 he controlled 36.8%, including the shares of his family members. By 1910 Cavallier was worth 10 million gold francs, a large but not huge amount. After World War I he controlled 43% of the company's capital. His motivation seems to have been primarily to build up the enterprise through hard work rather than to make a personal fortune.

Cavallier built his house beside the factory on the Nancy–Metz road so that he could be "in the middle of his hive." He would work long hours, from 6 in the morning until late at night. A general strike started at Pont-à-Mousson in September 1905, the first, triggered by dismissal of the union's treasurer but caused by long-running grievances over pay. The strike was a shock to the management. Cavallier founded the Fête du travail (Labour Festival) in 1906 in an attempt to reunite the community. In 1910 the steelmaker François de Wendel ran for election as deputy in Briey, opposed by a local physician who was supported by the Fédération républicaine. He lost by 3,506 votes to the doctor's 3,820. Wendel was convinced, perhaps correctly, that Cavallier had engineered his defeat since he distrusted Wendel's dealings with union leaders and thought he had encouraged the strike . Unlike self-made men such as Cavallier and Alexandre Dreux of the Aciéries de Longwy, Wendel was aristocratic, which did not endear him with the other industrialists.

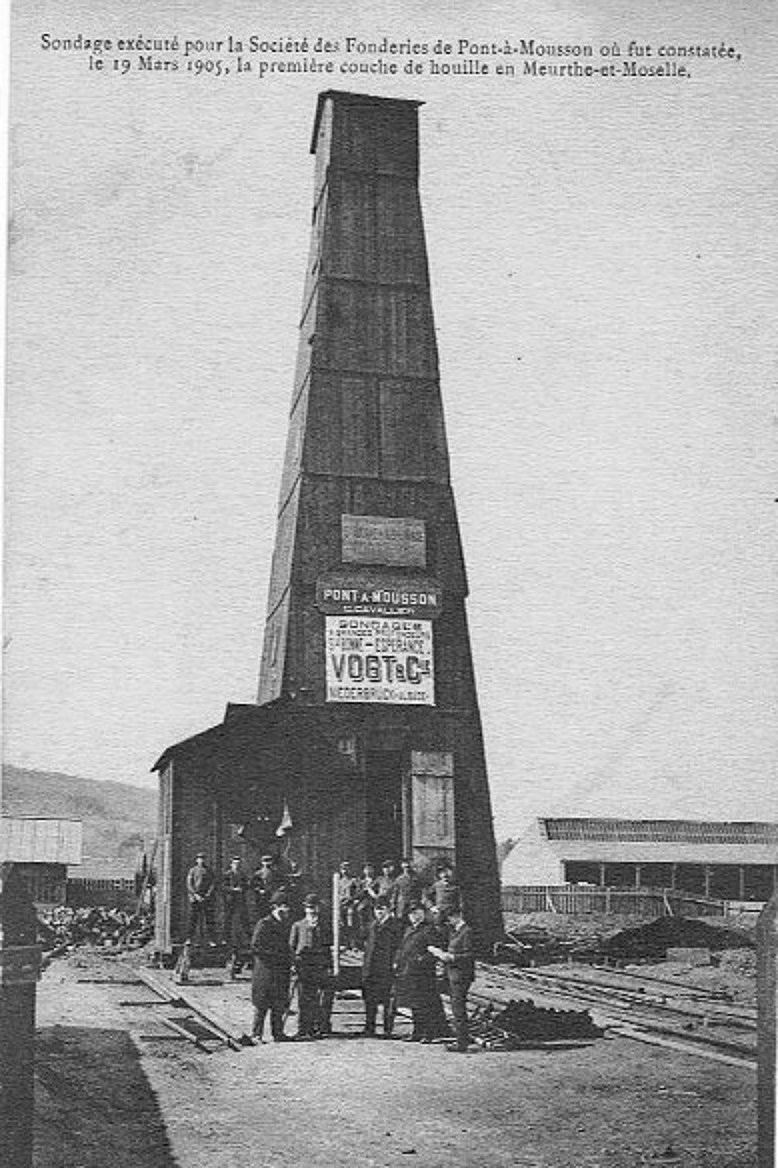
Exploratory drilling shaft for coal built in 1905 by the Société Joseph Vogt for the Société des Fonderies de Pont-à-Mousson

Cavallier transformed the moderately sized cast iron pipe manufacturer into a giant, always concentrating on making pipes. Annual cast iron production rose from 80,000 to 183,000 tons between 1900 and 1913. Cavallier studied use of blast furnace gas for production of electrical power, built a test station, then built a large central power station. He continued to increase the percent of pipes in the company output. In 1903 he installed blast furnaces at Auboué. In 1905 he built a foundry at Foug, throwing up the building and furnaces in a month. In 1905 Cavallier purchased the Moineville concession, which was later merged with the Auboué concession. The company acquired control of the Bayard foundries in Haute-Marne. It also took stakes in the Micheville and Marine-Homécourt steel makers, and after the war would take interests in steelworks in Lorraine and the Saar.

At the 23 January 1900 meeting Cavallier pointed out the importance of securing a supply of coke, and proposed to acquire a concession to open a new coal mine. In January 1902 Cavallier began to discuss a joint operation with the Société de Micheville and the Société du Nord et de l'Est to exploit coal deposits in northern Belgium, leading to incorporation of the Société Campinoise on 11 April 1902. The Beeringen-Coursel concession was granted to a group of three exploration companies on 26 November 1906, and Pont-à-Mousson participated in creation of the Société des Charbonnages de Beeringen (Beringen Coal Company) on 23 February 1907. The Beringen deposit was rich, but covered by a layer 550–700 metres (1,800–2,300 ft) thick of sands containing aquifers. It was not until after World War I (1914–18) that the first pit was opened on 26 December 1921. In Lorraine Cavallier explored for a continuation of the Saarbrücken coalfield. A test drill of 1,500 metres (4,900 ft) near the central station of the Pont-à-Mousson plant found several layers of coal, but only at great depth. The company took an interest in coal mines in several other parts of northern France.

== World War I (1914–18) ==
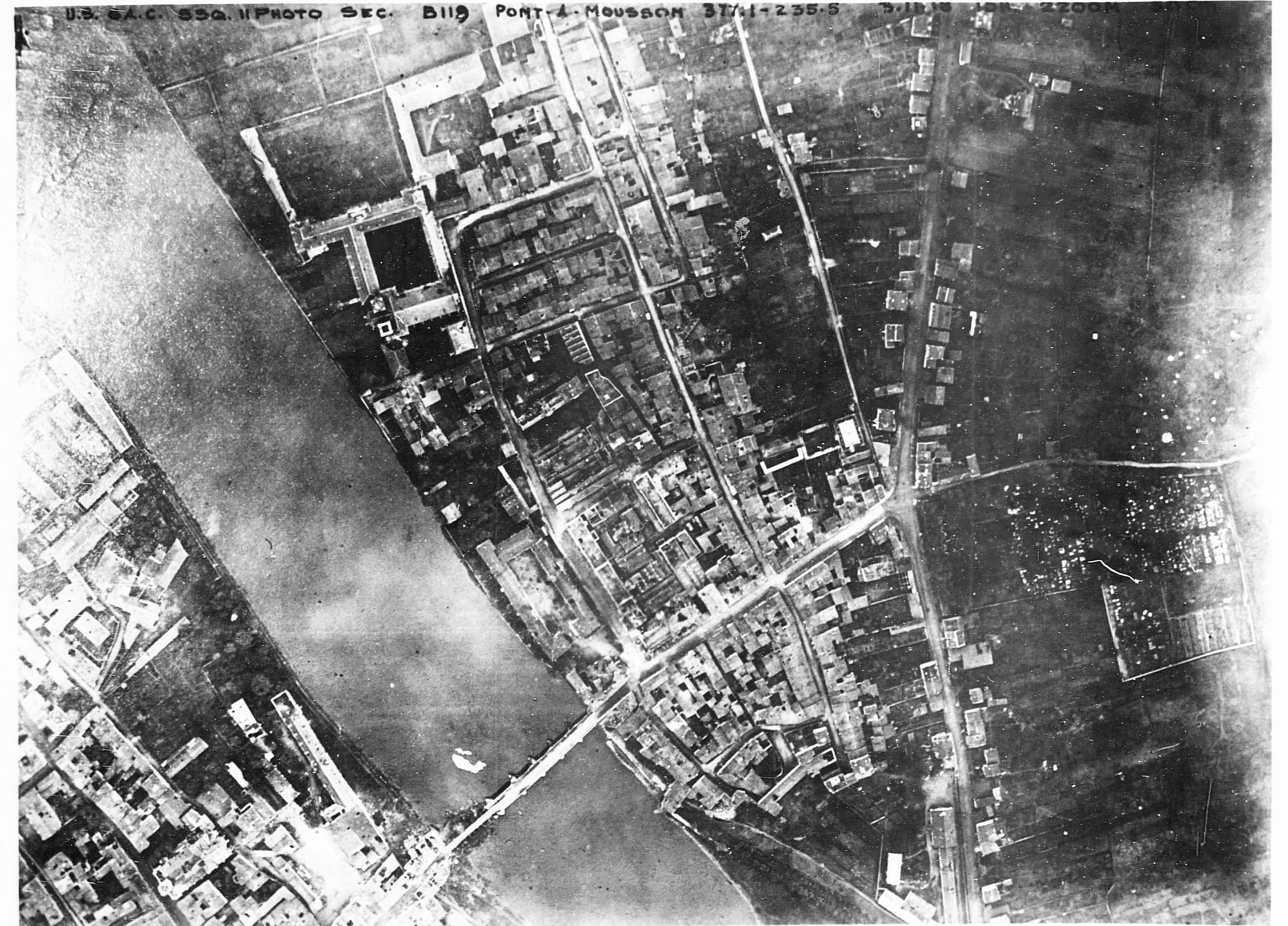
Pont-à-Mousson on 3 November 1918

At the start of World War I the Pont-à-Mousson factory was occupied by the Germans for a few days, and remained less than 3 kilometres (1.9 mi) from the front line. Auboué was occupied. The Foug factory remained in operation, and was converted to manufacture of munitions. Workshops were established at Belleville in 1916 and Sens in 1917. In 1917 Cavallier founded the Fonderie Lorraine to manufacture war materials in Saint-Étienne-du-Rouvray, near Rouen. His son in law, Marcel Paul, was given responsibility for the plant, which was built on 50 hectares (120 acres) between the railway and the river. By the end of the war 20% of French shells were being made from cast iron in the Foug foundry.

At the 24 January 1917 general meeting Cavallier proposed to appoint a board of directors with representatives of capital and labour. Cavallier became deputy chairman in 1917, and three administrators were named. Marcel Paul was titled administrateur délégué and the other two were titled administrateur directeur général. Towards the end of the war study groups under Humbert de Wendel defined the demands of the Comite des Forges for the post-war settlement. They wanted return of Alsace-Lorraine, cession of the Saar and transfer of Luxembourg from the German Customs Union to a union with Belgium. Camille Cavallier was one of a small number of iron masters who also wanted the left bank of the Rhine.

== Post-war period (1918–26) ==
In the post-war period the company faced a massive task of reconstruction, while training new workers to replace those lost in the war. In 1919–20 Pont-à-Mousson took over a major pipe-making facility in the Saar. The company also acquired interests in Lorraine companies that had been liquidated, notably Rombas, and acquired interests in coal mines in the Saar and Moselle. President Raymond Poincaré lit the first reconstructed blast furnace at Pont-à-Mousson 23 November 1919 in a solemn ceremony. Within France, Cavallier was in favor of quota agreements between competing companies to prevent destructive price wars. German demand for iron from Lorraine plummeted after World War I (1914–18). By 1922 total demand was just a tenth of the pre-war demand from the Ruhr alone. Contributing factors were the growing use of the Siemens-Martin process of open hearth furnaces for recycling scrap steel combined with availability of war material to be recycled. In early 1922 Robert Pinot of the Comité des forges explained to Camille Cavallier that this had "permitted a boycotting of our minette ore these past years." However, Pont-à-Mousson gradually regained its export markets.

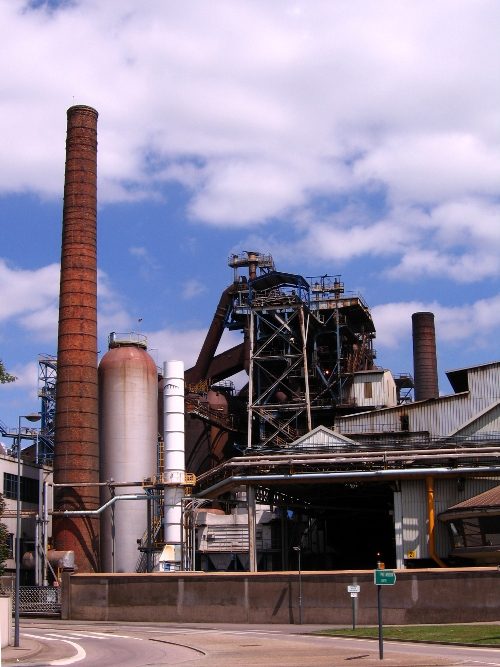
Blast furnace at Pont-à-Mousson (2008)

On 7 May 1924 Cavallier said the company was self-sufficient in iron ore, and would soon be self-sufficient in coke. It was not until 1925 that Cavallier was able to announce that production had returned to prewar levels. When Cavallier died in 1926 annual production had reached 237,000 tons. His strategy as a pipe specialist led him to move into the export market early on so the company would not depend on fluctuating domestic demand. By the time he died half of the company's output was exported, with 450 foreign cities using Pont-à-Mousson pipes, 127 of them outside of Europe. Cavallier knew that exports forced industry to become more competitive and efficient, and reduced costs helped domestic customers.

Cavallier became Vice-President of the Nancy Chamber of Commerce and a member of many committees and associations. He died of a heart attack on 10 June 1926 at his property of Gentilly, at Maxéville, near Nancy, the day after presiding over a general shareholders meeting. At the time of his death he was a member of the board of the Comité des Forges de France, director of about twenty companies, and had received many honors and official commissions. Cavallier had chosen his son-in-law, Marcel Paul, as his successor. The heirs of Xavier Rogé and two other shareholders, Colonel Plassiart and the Lorraine banker Paul Lenglet, still had sizeable shareholdings. In the early 1920s Cavallier arranged for them to form a pact within a financial company, Filor (Financière Lorraine). This lasted until 1964, when the founding families still controlled 50% of the capital of Pont-à-Mousson.

== Publications ==
- Camille Cavallier; F. Daubiné (November 1900), "Fonçage par congélation du puits n° 1 de la mine de fer d'Auboué de la Société anonyme des hauts-fourneaux et fonderies de Pont-à-Mousson", Annales des mines, Paris: Vve C. Dunod
- Camille Cavallier; Fernand Chapsal (1909), L'Exposition de Bruxelles 1910, Nancy: Impr. nancéienne / Chambre de commerce de Nancy
- Camille Cavallier (1914), Fours à coke pour usines sidérurgiques, où doit-on les construire ?, Paris: impr. de G. Gotscho
- Camille Cavallier (1915), Commerce extérieur de la France. La France exportatrice et l'Allemagne exportatrice, Paris: impr. de Chaix
- Camille Cavallier (1917), Une formule de rémunération du personnel industriel et commercial, Nancy: impr. de Rigot
- Camille Cavallier (1917), Après guerre. La Métallurgie française. Des améliorations, évolutions et réformes qui seraient nécessaires dans ses méthodes, ses moyens, son esprit (report to the Ligue française), Paris: impr. de Chaix
- Camille Cavallier (1918), "Les patrons, l'industrie", L'Avenir de la France, réformes nécessaires, Bibliothèque d'histoire contemporaine, foreword by Maurice Herbette, Paris: F. Alcan
- Camille Cavallier (1921), Notes économiques d'un métallurgiste. Extraits, Paris: impr.-libr.-éditeurs Gauthier-Villars et Cie, p. 153
- Camille Cavallier (1922), La Loi de huit heures, loi mortelle..., Notes économiques d'un métallurgiste, Nancy: Berger-Levrault
- Camille Cavallier (1923), La France victorieuse, Nancy: impr. de Royer
- Camille Cavallier (1926), Conférence sur l'hydrogéologie, faite à l'École supérieure de la métallurgie et de l'industrie des mines de Nancy, Nancy-Paris-Strasbourg: Berger-Levrault
- Camille Cavallier (1927), La Volute infernale. L'accroissement des prix depuis l'avant-guerre, Notes économiques d'un métallurgiste, Nancy: impr. de Berger-Levrault
- Camille Cavallier (1937), Sagesse du chef, lettres et notes inédites, impr. M. Darantière / Les Éditions du Raisin, p. 325

== Sources ==
- "Camille CAVALLIER (1854–1926)", Annales des Mines (in French)
- Camille Cavallier s'entretient avec des délégués syndicaux, 29 Mai 1908 (in French), Saint Gobain
- Garric, Alain, "Camille (m) CAVALLIER", geneanet (in French)
- Gaston-Breton, Tristan (8 August 2005), "Camille Cavallier", Les Echos, Ces innovateurs ou ces aventuriers qui ont transforme l'economie
- Gordon, David M. (1996), Liberalism and Social Reform: Industrial Growth and Progressiste Politics in France, 1880-1914, Greenwood Publishing Group, ISBN 978-0-313-29811-0
- Joly, Hervé (2008), Diriger une grande entreprise française au XXe siècle : modes de gouvernance, trajectoires et recrutement. (PDF), Histoire. Ecole des Hautes Etudes en Sciences Sociales (EHESS)
- Maier, Charles S. (2015-10-27), Recasting Bourgeois Europe: Stabilization in France, Germany, and Italy in the Decade after World War I, Princeton University Press, ISBN 978-1-4008-7370-8
- Vuillemin, Jean (October 2002), "Camille Cavallier", Arts et Métiers Magazine (in French), Fondation des Arts et Métiers, archived from the original on 2017-08-29
