= Jean-Martin Wendel =

French ironmaster (1665–1737)

- Born: 22 February 1665; Longlaville
- Died: 25 June 1737 (aged 72)
- Occupation: Steel maker
- Known for: Founder of the De Wendel steel making dynasty

Coat of arms of the Wendel family.

Jean-Martin Wendel (22 February 1665 – 25 June 1737) was a French industrialist based in Lorraine who was the founder of the De Wendel steel making dynasty.

== Origins ==
The name "Wendel" is derived from the Christian name Wendel or Wendelin (as in the town of Sankt Wendel in the Saar region). The de Wendel family can be traced back to Jean Wendel of Bruges, who married Marie de Wanderve around 1600. His son Jean-Georges Wendel, born on 8 October 1605 in Koblenz, married Marguerite de Hammerstein and became colonel of a regiment of Cravattes (Croatians) under the Emperor Ferdinand III.

Jean-Georges's son Christian Wendel was born on 23 April 1636 in Koblenz, and became a lieutenant in the army of Charles IV, Duke of Lorraine. In 1656 he married Dorothea Agnes Jacob, and in 1660 remarried, to Claire de Sansfeild. She was from an old family of the Duchy of Luxembourg. They had six daughters and three sons.

The sons were Francois Wendel, who died on 23 February 1742 without heirs, Jean-Martin Wendel (1665–1737), who founded the industrial fortune of the family, and Jean-Baptiste Wendel, an advocate at the Parliament of Metz in 1721.

== Life ==
Jean-Martin Wendel was born on 22 February 1665 in Longlaville, a domain that his mother brought as her dowry. His father owned several fiefs in Lorraine which he passed to Martin Wendel. Around 1700 Martin married Anne-Marie Meyer.

His wife was the daughter of a wealthy fermier (presumably a tax collector rather than a farmer). Before 1704 Wendel directed a forge at Ottange, just north of Hayange.

Martin Wendel used his wife's money to buy the iron forge of Hayange from King Louis XIV of France. He paid 9,621 livres on 26 March 1704 for the works at Hayange. (Note: The first forge at Hayange had been established in 1323, and others were soon added, but after the Thirty Years' War (1618–48) only the Rodolphe and Morelle forges remained.) This was a significant amount of money since at the time a skilled craftsman would earn about 200 livres per year. The property included the Rodolphe forge, which had been created by Rodolphe de la Roche, the Magdelaine furnace, a hammer mill and a cutting mill. The mills were incomplete and the other equipment was in disrepair.

Two years earlier the works had been sold for 1,500 livres to Louis de Ridouet-Sancé, who probably invested about 9,000 livres but failed to make the business profitable. Wendel had to borrow about 30,000 livres from banks in Metz and Thionville to invest in the business.

The only commercial activities allowed to noblemen at the time were operating a forge, shipbuilding and glass making. The king used the sale of rights to operate forges as a source of revenue. Martin Wendel became seigneur d'Hayange. In 1709 he requested cession of the Morelle forge, which was ruined, since the owner Benoît de Malzy had failed to pay his feudal dues to Wendel as seigneur of Hayange.

Acquisition of this forge was confirmed by 1711. On 17 November 1711 he purchased the position of King's Counselor in the Chancellery of the Parliament of Metz. This confirmed his position as a minor noble. (Note: Estimates of the number of new nobles created in France in the 18th century vary from 6,500 to 10,000. "King's secretary", a sinecure in the Paris or provincial parlement chancelleries, was the preferred post, with at least 3,200 created. An officeholder of 20 years, or one who died in office, attained full noble status in the second estate for himself and his heirs. Most of the new nobles were government officials, but there was a wide range of members of the upper bourgeoisie. Jean Martin Wendel, Jean Dietrich and Elie Lefebvre were examples of successful industrialists who were ennobled.)

Martin Wendel bought land, particularly woodland as a source of charcoal for the forges, and had five furnaces in operation by 1720. Around 1720 he rebuilt the Hayange chateau. For most of the 18th century the forge sold all its output to the royal artillery works in Thionville. The War of the Spanish Succession caused high demand for iron to make weapons. Jean-Martin Wendel's acquisition of the Rodolphe forge marked the transition from artisan manufacture to industrialization. Exploiting local supplies of iron and wood, Wendel and his son Charles built Hayange into the largest iron enterprise in Lorraine in the eighteenth century.

Martin Wendel was granted letters patent dated 17 February 1727 in Lunéville by Leopold, Duke of Lorraine. The letters patent confirmed his ancient nobility independent of the forges, but noted that the nobility could not be formally proved since the titles had been "lost in the misfortune of war". (Note: After acquiring nobility the Wendel family enhanced their status by marrying into old families.) Martin Wendel died on 25 June 1737, and his wife died on 12 September 1740. By the time Wendel died the value of the business was estimated at 700,000 livres. His son, François Ignace de Wendel, fought for protectionist tariffs on finished metal, combined with no taxes on import of raw material. Martin Wendel was followed by eight generations of steelmakers.

== Sources ==
- Giudice, Manlio Del; Peruta, Maria Rosaria Della; Carayannis, Elias G. (2010-12-06), Knowledge and the Family Business: The Governance and Management of Family Firms in the New Knowledge Economy, Springer Science & Business Media, ISBN 978-1-4419-7353-5
- Hayange au travers des siècles (in French), Ville de Hayange, archived from the original on 2017-08-05
- James, Harold (2006), FAMILY CAPITALISM, Harvard University Press, ISBN 978-0-674-02181-5
- Landes, David S. (1999-05-17), The Wealth and Poverty of Nations: Why Some Are So Rich and Some So Poor, W. W. Norton, ISBN 978-0-393-06981-5
- "Le Château", Le Château Guy de Wendel, archived from the original on 2017-06-28
- Marseille, Jacques (November 2005), "Wendel : Les secrets de longévité d'une " Maison " tricentenaire", Les Enjeux (in French) (207), archived from the original on 2013-07-22
- McCahill, Michael W. (Winter 1998), "Open Elites: Recruitment to the French Noblesse and the English Aristocracy in the Eighteenth Century", Albion: A Quarterly Journal Concerned with British Studies, 30 (4), The North American Conference on British Studies: 599–629, doi:10.2307/4053851, JSTOR 4053851
- Nobiliaire universel de France: ou Recueil général des généalogies historiques des maisons nobles de ce royaume, Au bureau du Nobiliaire universel de France, Réimprimé à la Librairie Bachelin-Deflorenne, 1873
- Smith, Michael Stephen (2006), The Emergence of Modern Business Enterprise in France, 1800–1930, Harvard University Press, ISBN 978-0-674-01939-3
- "Wendel", Section Genealogique, Association Artistique de la Banque de France, archived from the original on 2016-03-03
