= Hadjar =

Hadjar may refer to:

== People ==
- Chérif Hadjar (born 1965), Algerian football manager
- Ibnu Hadjar (1920–1965), Indonesian Islamic militant
- Isack Hadjar (born 2004), French and Algerian racing driver
- Kenza Hadjar (born 1992), Algerian footballer
- Ki Hadjar Dewantara (1889–1959), Indonesian activist, politician and educator
- Linda Hadjar (born 1982), French athletics competitor

== Places ==
- El Hadjar
- El Hadjar District

== Other uses ==
- El Hadjar Complex

== See also ==
- Hajar (disambiguation)
