= Draa Errich =

Coordinates: 36°52′N 7°30′E

Draa Errich ذراع اریش
- Interactive map of Draa Errich
- Country: Algeria
- Province: Annaba
- Time zone: UTC+1 (West Africa Time)

Draa Errich (Arabic: ذراع اریش) is a village in Berrahal district in the province of Annaba in north-eastern Algeria.
