= Aïn El Berda District =

Coordinates: 36°39′N 7°35′E

Aïn El Berda District دائرة عين الباردة
- District
- Map of Algeria highlighting Annaba Province
- Country: Algeria
- Province: Annaba
- District seat: Aïn El Berda

Population (1998)
  - Total: 35,543
- Time zone: UTC+01 (CET)
- Municipalities: 3

Aïn El Berda is a district in Annaba Province, Algeria. It was named after its capital, Aïn El Berda. It is the least populous district in the province.

== Municipalities ==
The district is further divided into 3 municipalities:

- Aïn El Berda
- El Eulma
- Chorfa
