= Oued El Aneb =

Coordinates: 36°53′N 7°29′E

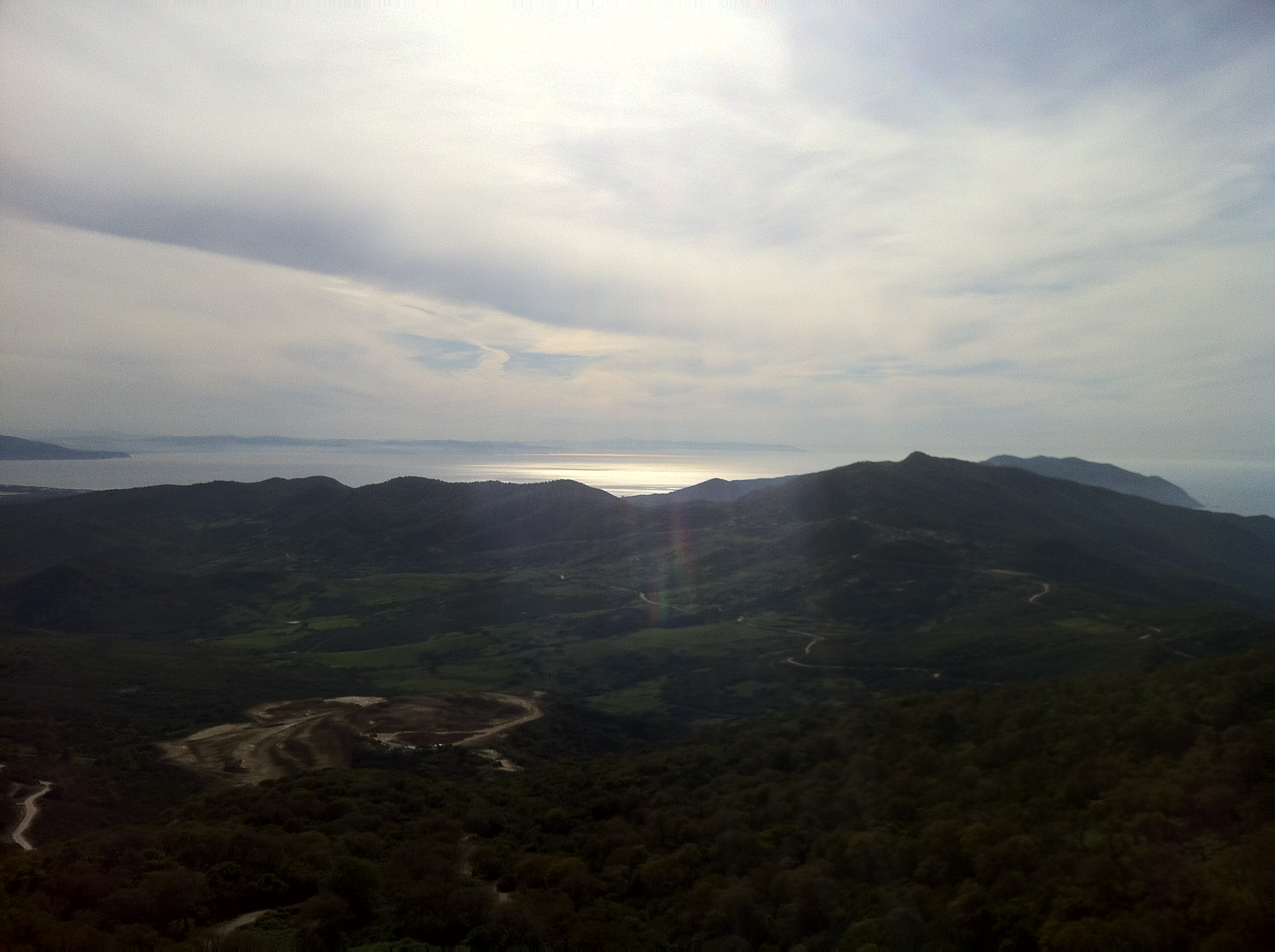

- Coastline near Oued El Aneb
- Country: Algeria
- Province: Annaba
- Elevation: 15 m (49 ft)

Population (2008)
  - Total: 21,088
- Time zone: UTC+1 (West Africa Time)

Oued El Aneb is a town in north-eastern Algeria. The town of Oued El Aneb (وادي العنب) (ⵡⴻⴷ ⵍⵄⴻⵏⴱ) is a commune of Algeria, located in the wilaya of d'Annaba at 36° 53′ 00″n, 7° 29′ 00″ e on the Mediterranean Sea between the towns of Chetaïbi, and Annaba. The population of the town is 21088. Lake Fetzara is to the south.
