= Berrahal District =

Coordinates: 36°50′N 7°27′E

Berrahal District دائرة برحال
- District
- Map of Algeria highlighting Annaba Province
- Country: Algeria
- Province: Annaba
- District seat: Berrahal

Population (1998)
  - Total: 41,076
- Time zone: UTC+01 (CET)
- Municipalities: 3

Berrahal is a district in Annaba Province, Algeria. It was named after its capital, Berrahal.

== Municipalities ==
The district is further divided into 3 municipalities:

- Berrahal
- Oued El Aneb
- Treat
