= Oued Meboudja =

- Location in Algeria

Location
- Country: Algeria
- Province: Annaba

Physical characteristics
- Mouth
  - coordinates: 36.823056°N 7.738056°E

Basin features
- River system: Seybouse River

Oued Meboudja is a wadi in Annaba (Algeria).

== Location ==
The wadi is a left tributary of the Seybouse River, which it joins near El Hadjar to the south of the industrial center of Annaba.

== Human impact ==
In 1877 the Société Mokta El Hadid mining company gained permission to drain the Lake of Fetzara in exchange for free transfer of the reclaimed land. A channel led from the center of the lake, crossed the 22 metres (72 ft) western flank and led to the Oued Meboudja. The surface elevation had dropped to 12 metres (39 ft) by 1880, but the lake remained swampy in summer.

In May 2007 it was reported that farmers who used the waters of the wadi to irrigate their lands were greatly concerned about pollution. A study published in 2013 found that the El Hadjar iron and steel works was discharging metallic pollution into the wadi, with unacceptably high levels of copper and varying concentrations of iron, chromium and nickel.

== Sources ==
- "L'oued Meboudja pollué", El Watan (in French), Annaba, 16 May 2007
- Hannouche, M.; Souames, S. (2015), "Impact of Storage of Ferrous and Non-ferrous Waste Meboudja in the Area on the Environment (El-Hadjar, North East Algeria)", Energy Procedia, 74: 1112–1118, doi:10.1016/j.egypro.2015.07.752, ISSN 1876-6102
- Travers, L. (May–June 1958), "La Mise en Valeur du Lac Fetzara", Annales de Géographie (in French), 67 (361), Armand Colin: 260–262, JSTOR 23443549
- Zenati, N.; Messadi, D.; Belahcene, N. (2013), "Effet du rejet de l'usine sidérurgique d'Annaba sur les objectifs environnementaux de l'Oued Meboudja. Algérie", Cahiers de l'ASEES (in French), 18: 1–7, doi:10.1051/asees/2013007
