= Chorfa =

Chorfa may refer to:

- Sharif or Chérif (Darija: Chorfa), a traditional Arab title meaning "noble", "highborn" (for Sunnis, suggesting descent from Muhammad)
- one of several places in Algeria:
  - Chorfa, Annaba, a municipality or commune in Annaba province, Algeria
  - Chorfa, Bouïra, a municipality or commune in Bouïra province, Algeria
  - Chorfa, Boumerdès, a village in Boumerdès province, Algeria
  - Chorfa, Mascara, a municipality or commune in Mascara province, Algeria
  - Chorfa, Chlef, a suburb of Chlef in Chlef province, Algeria
