= El Hadjar District =

Coordinates: 36°48′N 7°44′E

El Hadjar District دائرة الحجار
- District
- Map of Algeria highlighting Annaba Province
- Country: Algeria
- Province: Annaba
- District seat: El Hadjar

Population (1998)
  - Total: 106,767
- Time zone: UTC+01 (CET)
- Municipalities: 2

El Hadjar is a district in Annaba Province, Algeria. It was named after its capital, El Hadjar.

== Municipalities ==
The district is further divided into 2 municipalities:

- El Hadjar
- Sidi Amar
