= Ad Plumbaria =

Civitas (town) of the Roman North Africa

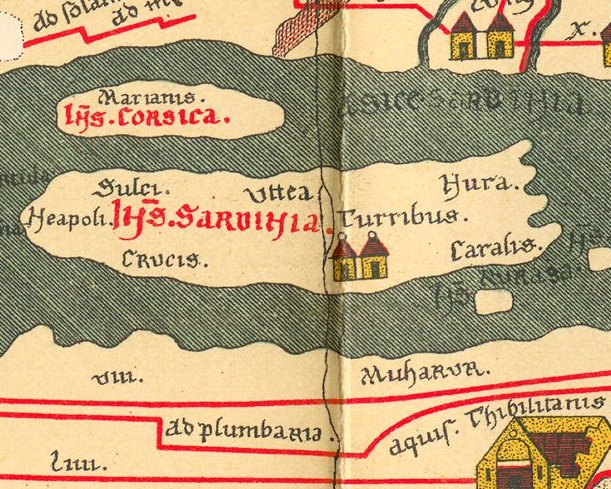
Tabula Peutingeriana showing Ad Plumbaria

Ad Plumbaria was a civitas (town) of the Roman North Africa. The town flourished during AD 300–640.

The town is shown on the Tabula Peutingeriana, as being on the road to Hippo Regius.

The presumed ruins of the town were discovered in the mid-1800s in the middle of the Lake of Fetzara.
