= Chetaïbi District =

Chataibi District
- District
- Country: Algeria
- Province: Annaba Province
- County seat: Chetaïbi

Area
  - Total: 52 sq mi (134 km^{2})

Population (2008)
  - Total: 8,035
  - Density: 160/sq mi (60/km^{2})
- Time zone: UTC+1 (CET)

The Chataibi District is an Algerian administrative district in the Annaba province. Its chief town is located on the eponymous town of Chetaïbi.

== Communes ==
The daira is composed of only one commune: Chetaïbi.
