= Bois, Charente-Maritime =

Commune in Nouvelle-Aquitaine, France

Bois
- Commune
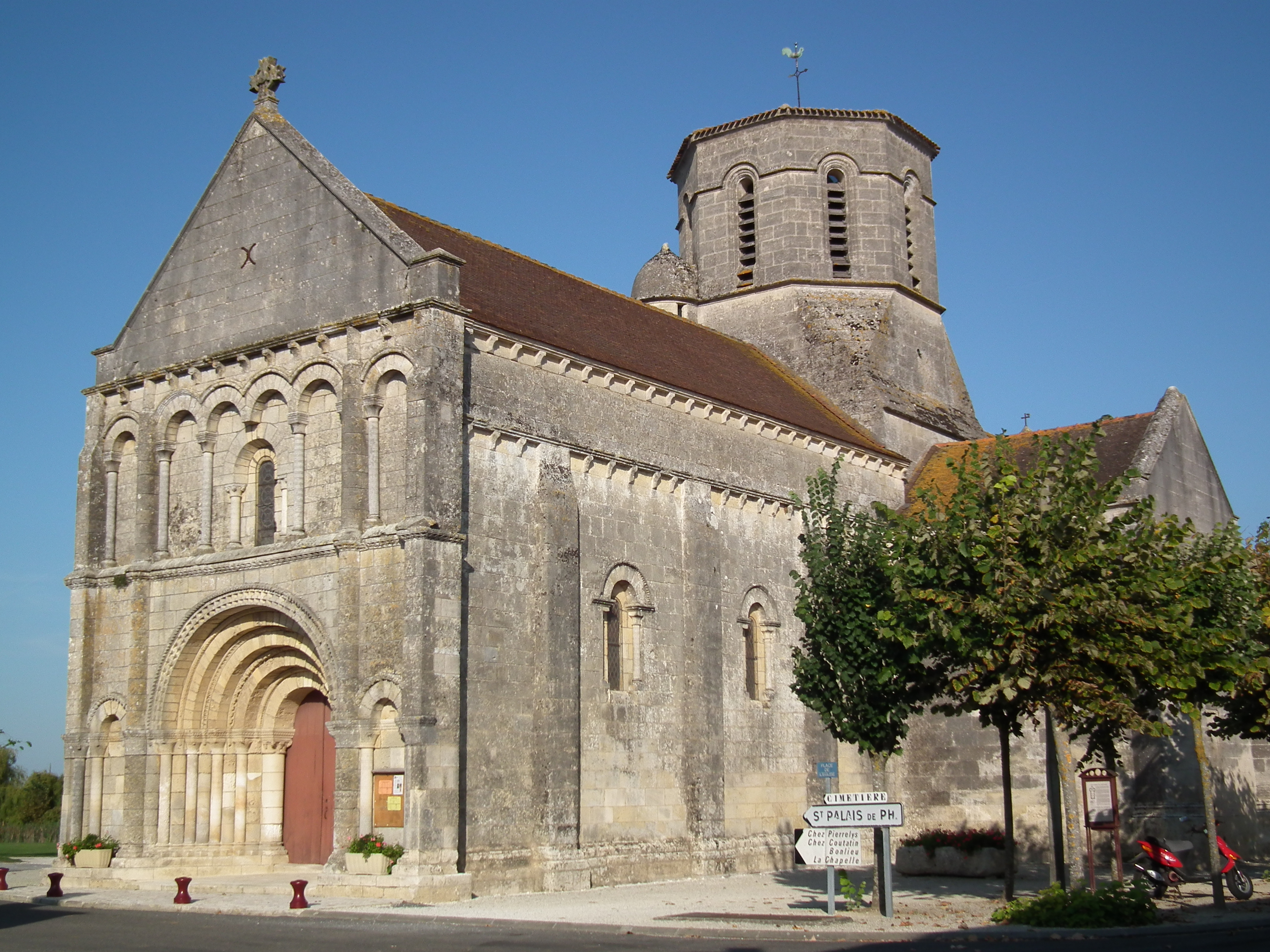
- The church in Bois
- Location of Bois
- Location within France Location within Nouvelle-Aquitaine
- Coordinates: 45°29′17″N 0°35′55″W
- Country: France
- Region: Nouvelle-Aquitaine
- Department: Charente-Maritime
- Arrondissement: Jonzac
- Canton: Pons

Government
  - Mayor (2020–2026): Thierry Annereau
- Area^{1}: 21.12 km^{2} (8.15 sq mi)
- Highest elevation: 59 m (194 ft)
- Lowest elevation: 29 m (95 ft)
- Population (2023): 523
  - Density: 24.8/km^{2} (64.1/sq mi)
- Time zone: UTC+01:00 (CET)
  - Summer (DST): UTC+02:00 (CEST)
- INSEE/Postal code: 17050 /17240
- ^{1} French Land Register data, which excludes lakes, ponds, glaciers > 1 km^{2} (0.386 sq mi or 247 acres) and river estuaries.

Bois (French pronunciation: [bwa]) is a commune in the Charente-Maritime department in southwestern France.

== Population ==
Historical population
| Year | Pop. | ±% p.a. |
|---|---|---|
| 1968 | 473 | — |
| 1975 | 459 | −0.43% |
| 1982 | 456 | −0.09% |
| 1990 | 427 | −0.82% |
| 1999 | 428 | +0.03% |
| 2007 | 472 | +1.23% |
| 2012 | 542 | +2.80% |
| 2017 | 530 | −0.45% |
| 2023 | 523 | −0.22% |
Source: INSEE

== International relations ==
Bois is twinned with:

- Treat, Algeria
- Tát, Hungary

== See also ==
- Communes of the Charente-Maritime department
