= Annaba District =

Coordinates: 36°54′N 7°45′E

Annaba District دائرة عنابة
- District
- Map of Algeria highlighting Annaba Province
- Country: Algeria
- Province: Annaba
- District seat: Annaba

Population (2008)
  - Total: 609.499
- Time zone: UTC+01 (CET)
- Municipalities: 2

Annaba is a district in Annaba Province, Algeria. It is the most populous district in the province. It was named after its capital, Annaba, which is also the capital of the province.

== Municipalities ==
The district is further divided into 2 municipalities:

- Annaba
- Seraïdi
