= Eustache Cuicci =

French politician (1908–1980)

- Born: 20 September 1908; Bône, French Algeria
- Died: 25 April 1980 (aged 71); Nantes, France
- Occupation: Politician

Eustache Cuicci (1908-1980) was a French politician. He served as a member of the National Assembly from 1956 to 1958, representing Deux-Sèvres.
