= Raoul Borra =

French politician (1896–1988)

Raoul Borra (14 August 1896 – 28 February 1988) was a French politician.

Borra was born in Bône, Algeria. He represented the French Section of the Workers' International (SFIO) in the Constituent Assembly elected in 1945, in the Constituent Assembly elected in 1946 and in the Chamber of Deputies from 1946 to 1951.
