= Eulma, Annaba =

Eulma العلمة (Arabic) Lɛelma (Kabyle)

- Location within Algeria
- Coordinates: 36°44′20″N 7°27′42″E
- Country: Algeria
- Province: Annaba

Population (2008)
  - Total: 10,136
- Time zone: UTC+1 (West Africa Time)

Eulma (Kabyle: Lɛelma; Arabic: العلمة) is a town in the Aïn El Berda District of Annaba Province in north-eastern Algeria.
