= Chetaïbi =

City in Annaba, Algeria

Coordinates: 37°03′58″N 7°22′49″E

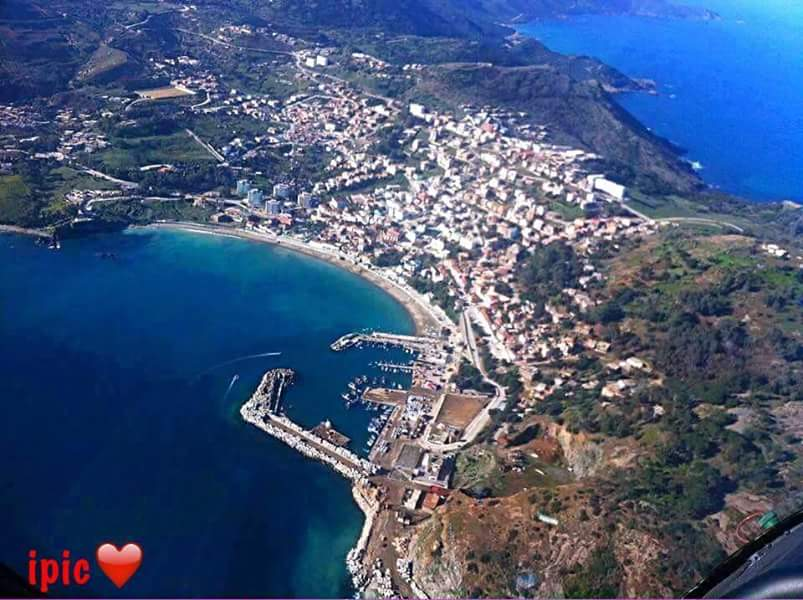
Chetaibi

Chetaïbi (Arabic: شطايبي; Berber languages: Ceṭṭaybi) (formerly Herbillon) is a small fishing port in Annaba Province, Algeria located on a peninsula west of Annaba.

== Geography ==
The commune of Chetaïbi is located about 62 km northwest of the wilayah of Annaba. Chetaïbi has a fishing port. The main beaches of Chetaïbi are Chétaibi, Les sables d'or, Oued Leghnem, Fountaine Romaine, La Baie Ouest and Sidi Akkacha.

The population of the town was 8035 in the 2008 census. The postal code of Chetaïbi is 23014.

== Gallery ==
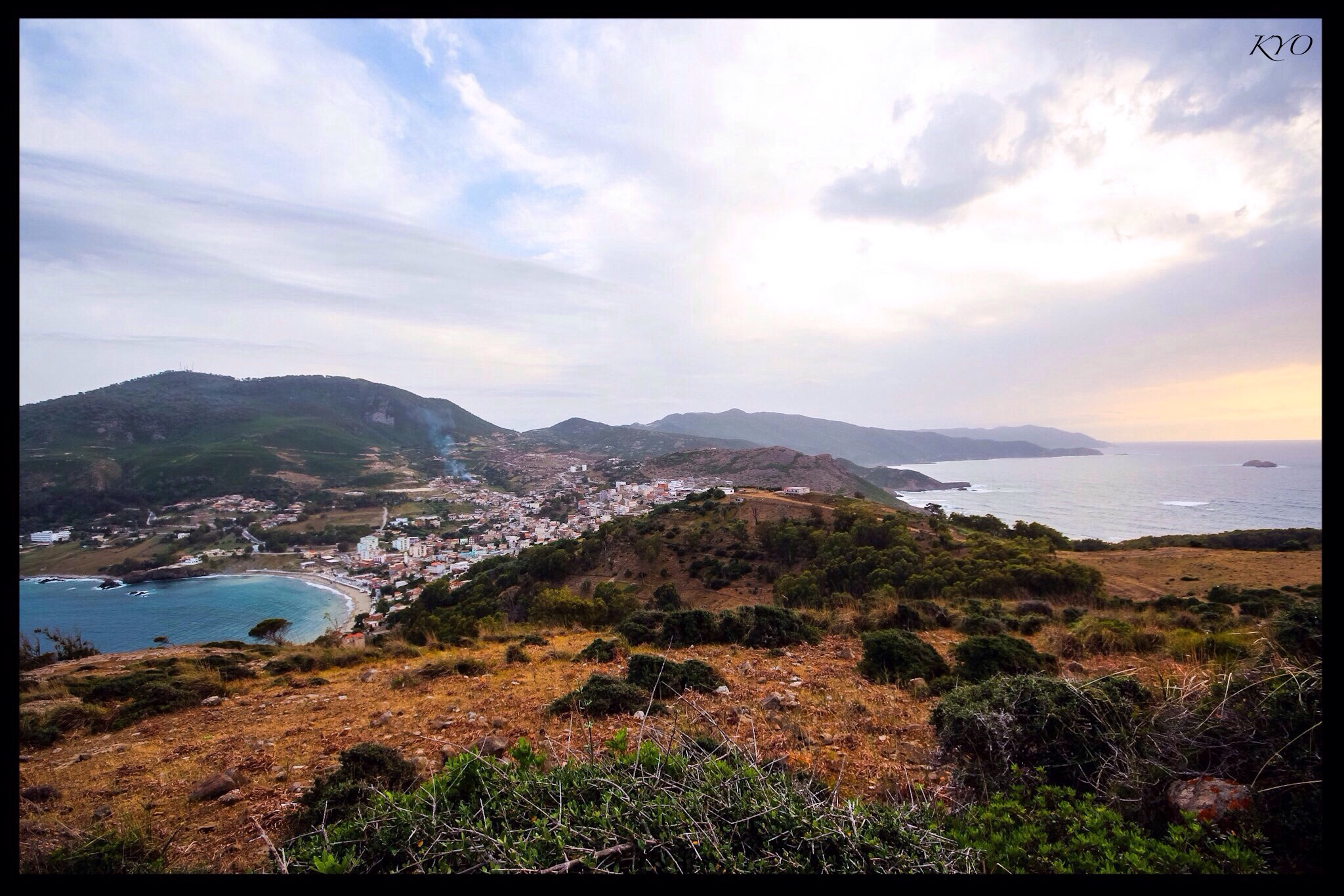
Village of Chetaïbi

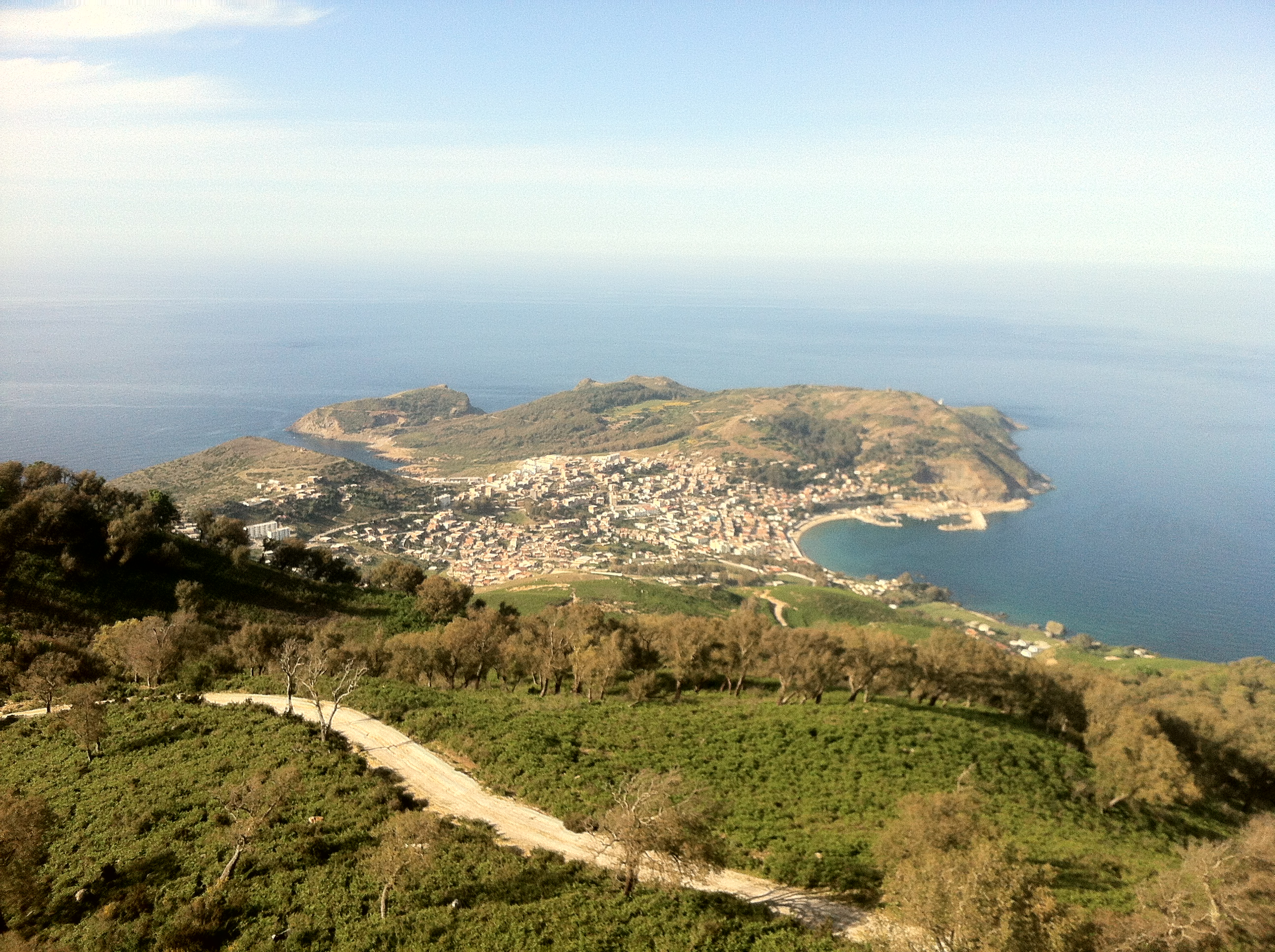
Aerial view of Chetaïbi

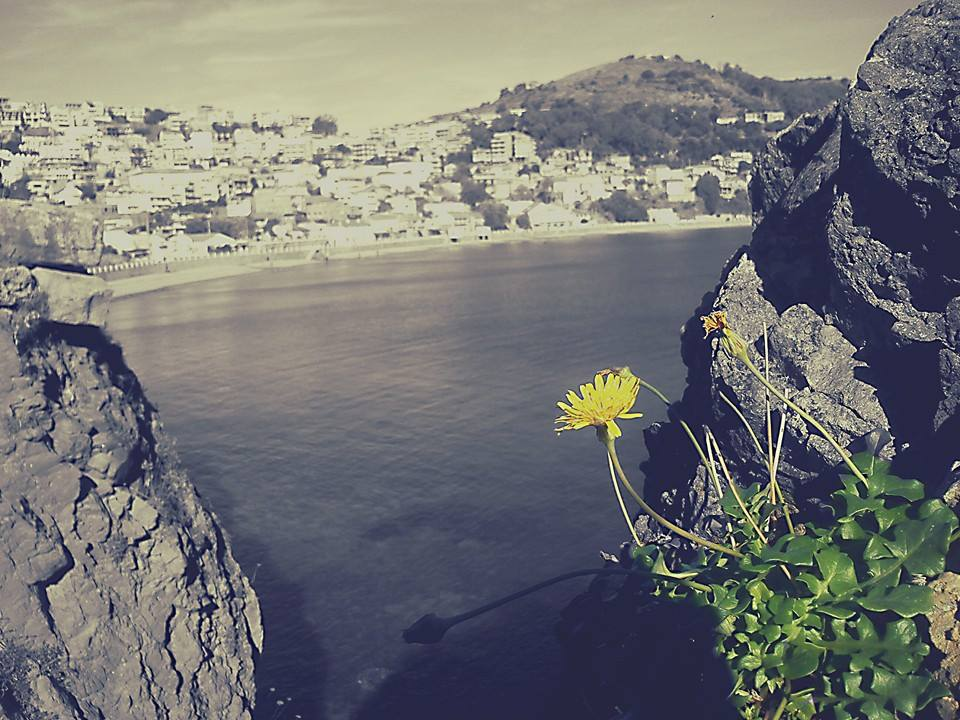
Chetaïbi

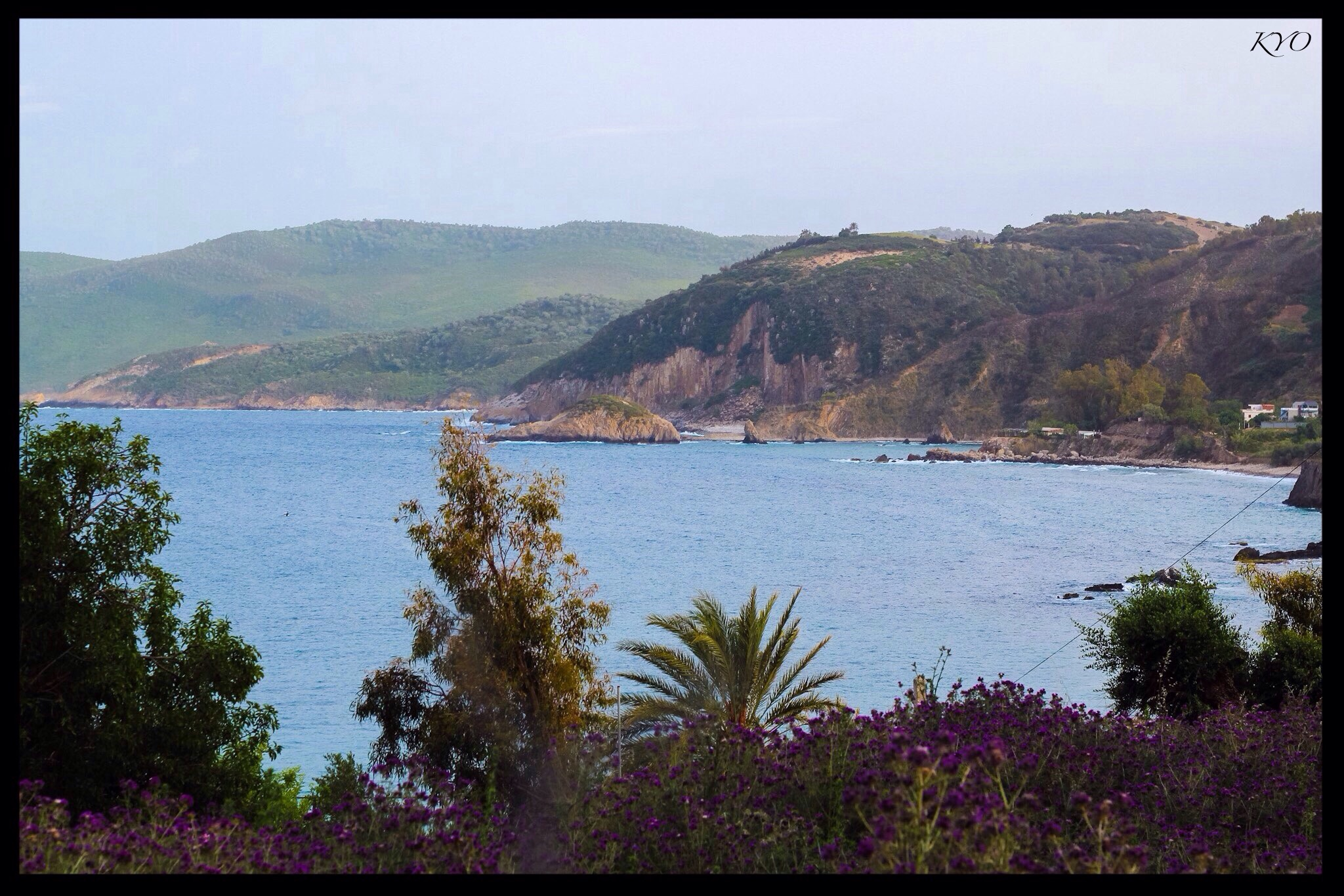
Chetaïbi

== History ==
During the Roman Empire there was a Roman town called Tacuata and based on the remaining ruins, it was a relatively important city. In Roman times it was the starting point of a road to the west, marked by Muharur (Sidi Akkacha), Zacca (Cape de Fer), where red porphyry was mined and exported to Rome through the port on the Seybouse, then Culucitanis (El Marsa) and Paratienis (Guerbes).

With Muslim conquests of the Maghreb, the Arabs renamed the town "Tekkouch", from the Berber "Teccuche". Several places along the shore are associated with legends of the neighboring peoples. The local population considers the bay of Sidi Akacha "sacred". For about a decade it was frequented by armed terrorists because of its isolation and rugged forested terrain. The forest, extensive along this part of the coast, is greatly admired with very rigorous asceticism. A number of mausoleums host brilliant fantasia, as in Sidi Boufernana every year.

In 1830, during the siege of Annaba, a clandestine flotilla came every night from Tekouch to supply the inhabitants of the city with provisions. At that time, a historical event of great size was not lacking in certain interest and deserves a precision: since it is there, even in the Edough, where its maquis has preserved in the mountains the memory of the revolt of si Zeghdoud. From a family of scholars bearing the name of Oued Jemaoune, he was born in Souk el had (Ain oum elrakha today) against the occupier although dating from the first day gained in magnitude in June 1841 refugee to Sidi Akkacha.

At the end of the 19th century, Tekouch took the name of the French general Émile Herbillon. At the time when the ship Le Caramy transported passengers between Bône and Herbillon, the first doctors to practice there were Drs Bendjelloul and Monpére.

After Algerian independence the town was renamed Chetaïbi.
