= Seraïdi =

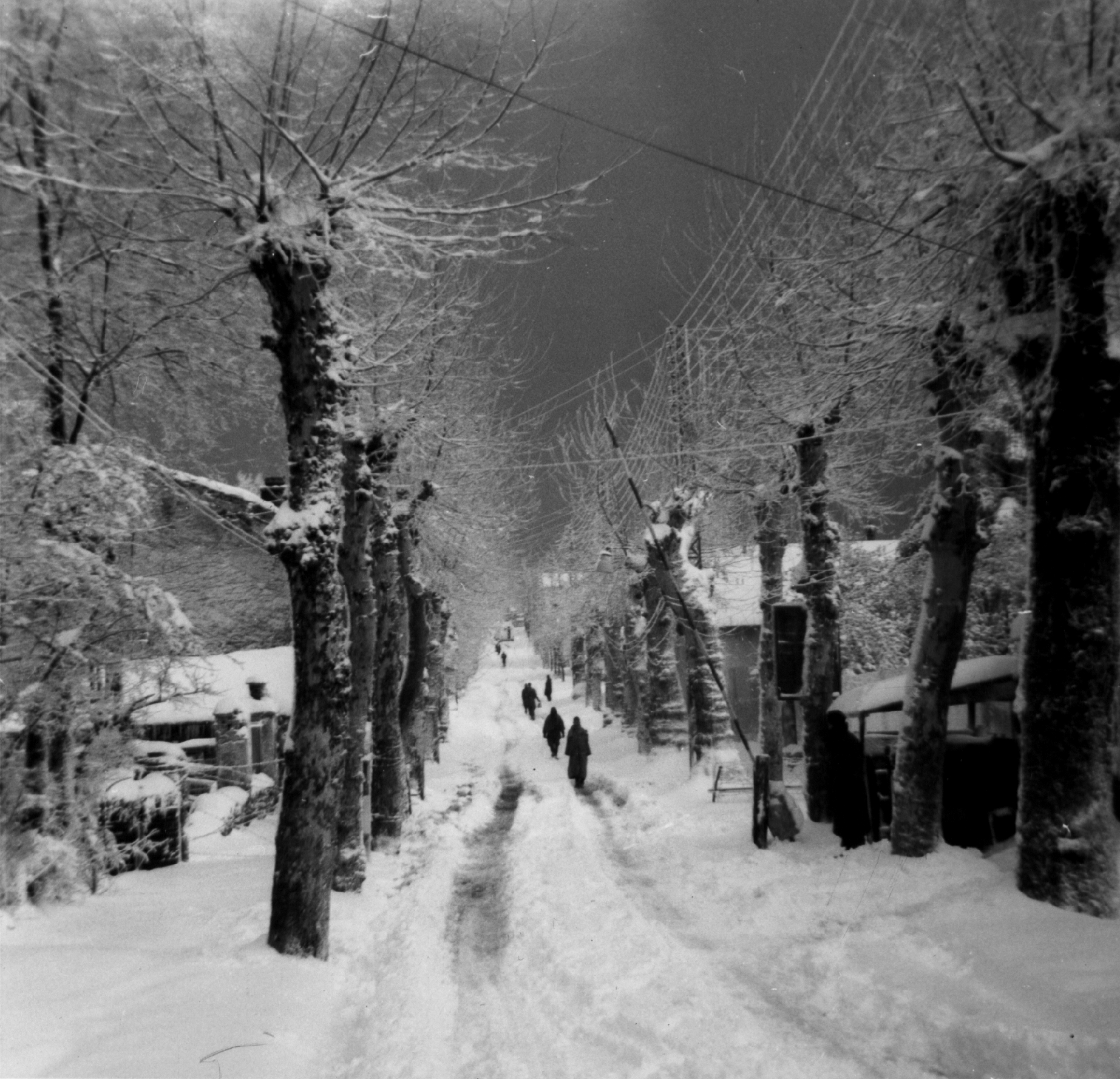
- Nickname: (سرايدي)

- Location within Algeria
- Coordinates: 36.916667°N 7.666667°E
- Country: Algeria
- Province: Annaba

Population (2008)
  - Total: 7,626
- Time zone: UTC+1 (West Africa Time)

Seraïdi is a town in north-eastern Algeria.

== Geography ==
Seraidi (سرايدي) the town is located north of the wilaya of Annaba, on the heights of the massif of Edough 860 meters and 13.3 kilometers from Annaba town. information 36° 55'00" north, 7° 40'00" east. The village population was 7626 inhabitants in 2008.

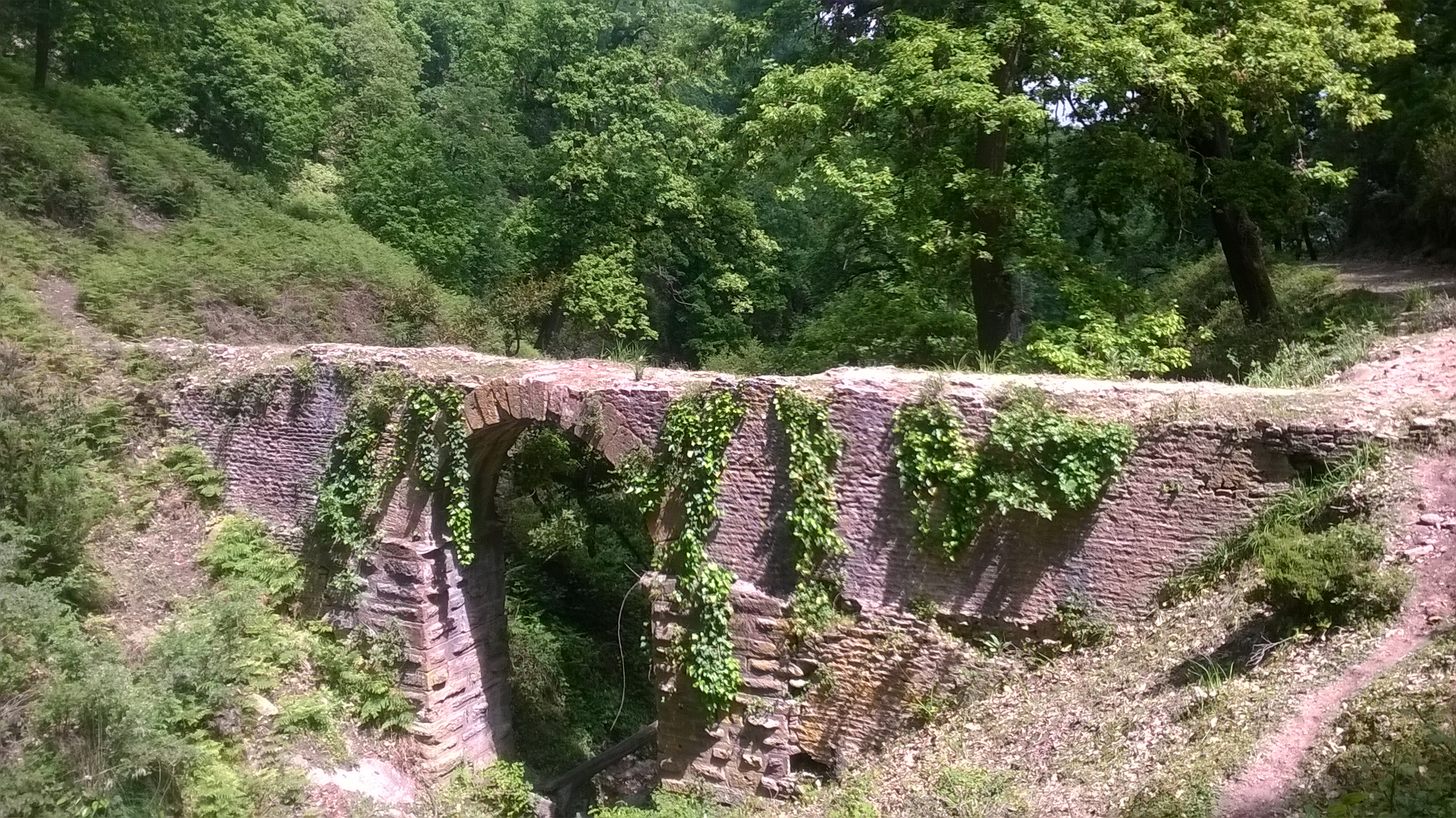
Roman Aqueduct near Seraidi

The village sits on the Edough massif at an altitude of 860m. It was in the vicinity of this town that the fountain that serviced the Roman aqueducts that fed the cisterns of Hippo began. The highest nearby peak is Kef Sbaâ (lion rock), an apt name as it is claimed that many of the lions of the Coliseum in Rome were taken from the area. The Romans also used the area to hunt elephants, panthers and lynx.

The area is covered with cork oaks, and green oaks, Zen oaks, chestnut trees, walnut trees, olive trees, prickly pears, eucalyptus or even pines and firs . A Sanatorium and an old monastery are located in these forests and deposits of lead, zinc, and copper were found in the area in 1849.

== History ==
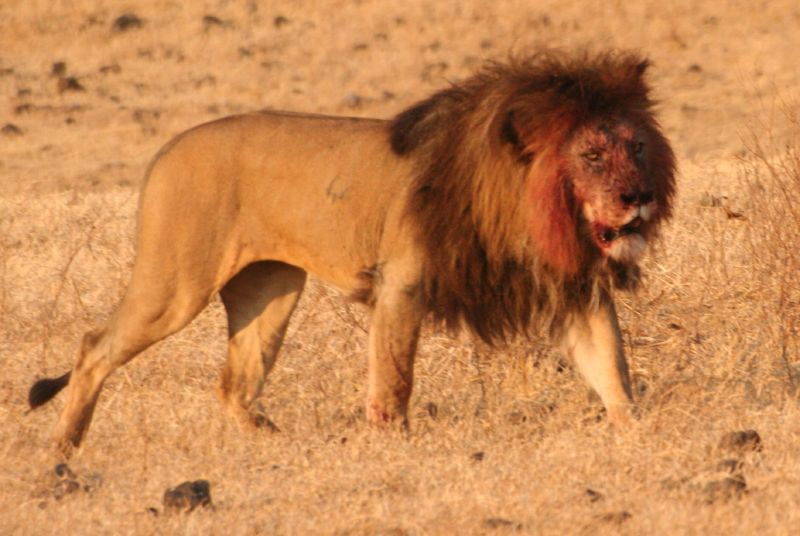
The Edough Massif was the place where the last lion of Algeria was killed.

The area was inhabited in Neolithic times, and was urbanized during the Roman Empire.

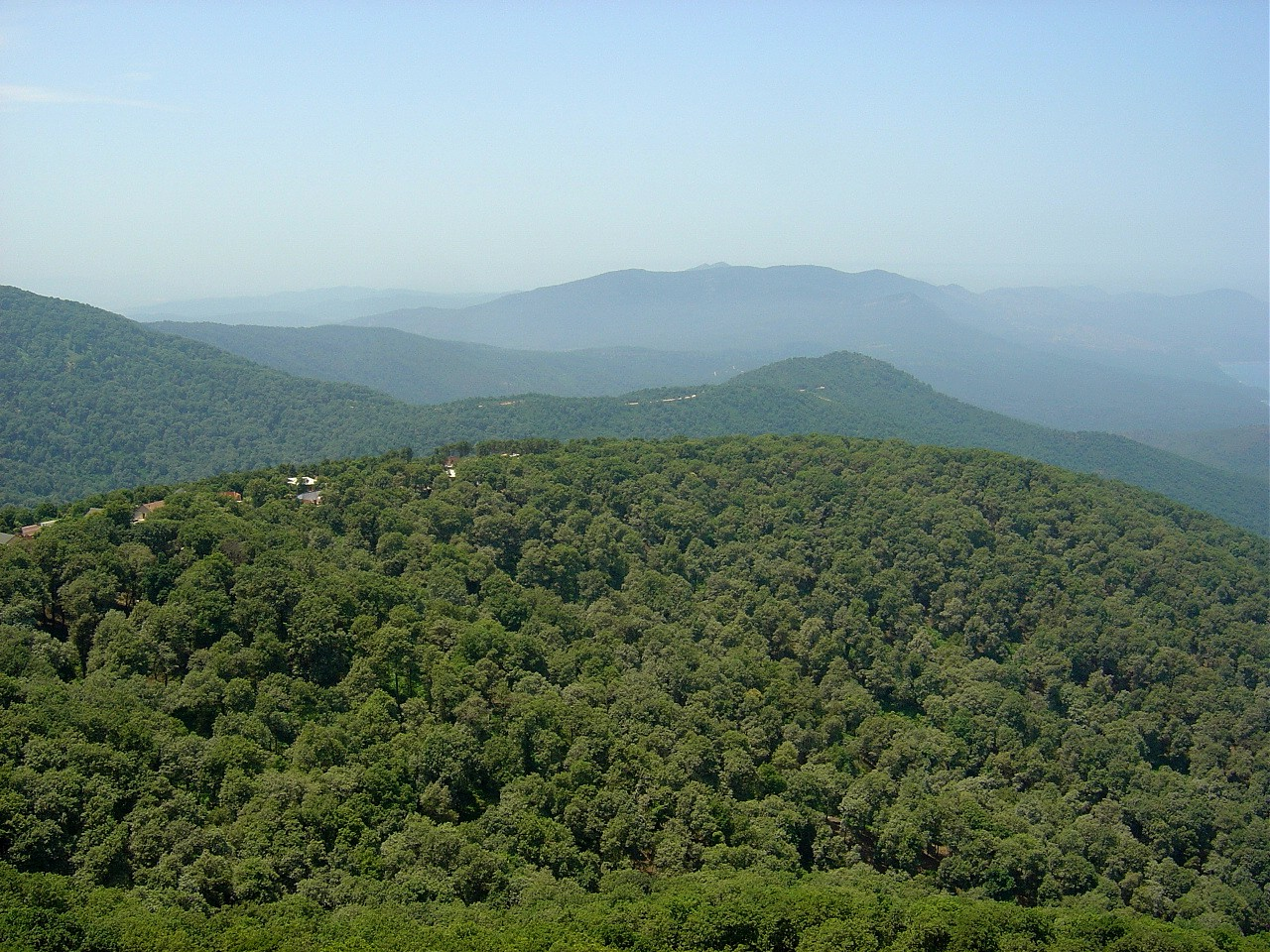
Forest around Seraïdi.

The village named Bugeaud during the French colonization, was established by decree of the 3 June 1847, located on the Edough massive at a place called Ain-Barouaga. It was a center of population of 24 fires and was assigned a territory of 162 hectares. It became a town by decree of 22 August 1861. The town added to the Bone department in 1955. The name of the town at this time was linked to the name of Marshal Bugeaud, but in 1962, with Algerian Independence, Bugeaud was renamed "Seraïdi".
