= Aïn Berda =

Aïn El Berda
- Commune and town
- Location of Aïn Berda within Annaba Province

- Location of Aïn Berda within Algeria
- Coordinates: 36°39′N 7°35′E
- Country: Algeria
- Province: Annaba
- Time zone: UTC+1 (West Africa Time)

Aïn Berda, officially Aïn El Berda and formerly Penthièvre, is a town and commune in north-eastern Algeria.
