= Lake Fetzara =

Lake in Algeria

Lake of Fetzara
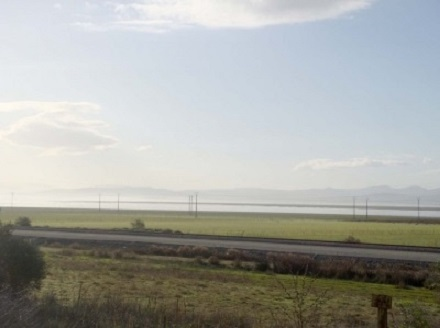

- Location within Algeria
- Location: North east of Algeria, South-east of the city of Annaba
- Coordinates: 36°47′N 7°31′E
- Basin countries: Algeria
- Max. length: 18 km (11 mi)
- Max. width: 13 km (8.1 mi)
- Surface area: 206.80 km^{2} (79.85 sq mi)

Ramsar Wetland
- Official name: Lac Fetzara
- Designated: 4 June 2003
- Reference no.: 1299

The Lake of Fetzara is located in northeastern Algeria, 18 km (11 mi) southeast of the city of Annaba. It measures 17 km (11 mi) from east to west and 13 km (8.1 mi) from north to south, with an area of about 18,600 hectares (46,000 acres). It was officially classified as an area "Ramsar", which involves protection of this location. Several studies have been conducted on water and soil of the region Fetzara [1-7]. These studies were carried out to monitor the salinity and to highlight its origins and factors governing it. The main objective of this study was to evaluate soil properties of Fetzara Lake that are affected by the phenomenon of salinization and to study their variation with depth. The samples were taken on the first two layers (0–20 cm and 20–40 cm) at eight points around the Fetzara Lake, for a total of 16 samples. The analytical results indicate that soil salinity has reached its maximum in the northeast (region of Wadi Zied) and south of Lake (region of Cheurfa) with a dominance of sodium chloride-chemical facies.

== Location ==
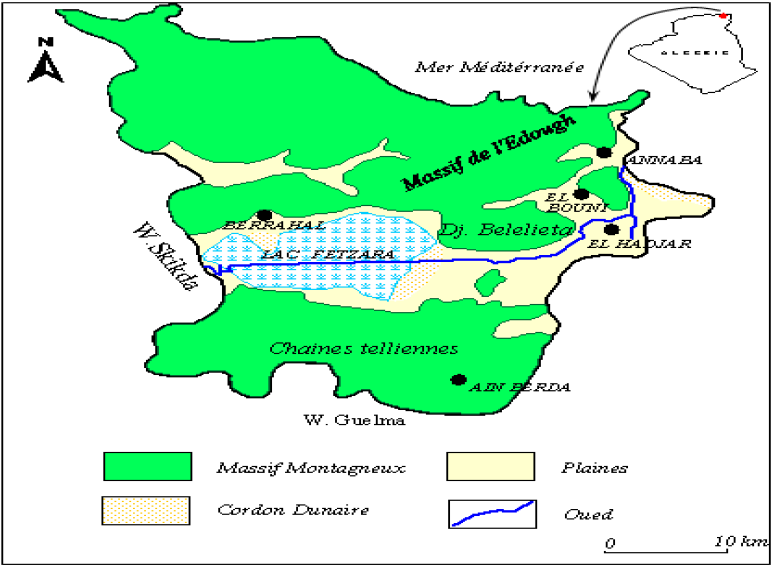
Geographic situation of Fetzara Lake

Fetzara Lake is located 18 km southeast of the city of Annaba in the extreme east of Algeria. It is 17 kilometres (11 mi) from east to west and 13 kilometres (8.1 mi) from north to south with a surface of about 18,600 hectares (46,000 acres). This area is subject to a Mediterranean climate with two distinct seasons: one humid and another dry. The lake water is temporary depending on the intensity of the rainy season on which it depends almost exclusively, it is generally an area of over 13000 ha of land flooded in winter and forming large meadows. The presence of a main channel across the lake from west to east provides the drainage, but it is insufficient to evacuate the water in the winter.

The geologist Henri Fournel discovered deposits of magnetite near the port of Bône in 1843. The mine is about 22 miles (35 km) from Bone in the Mokta hill beside the Lake of Fetzara at the foot of a mountain chain that runs from south to north, then turns east of the port of Bone. The name "Mokta-el-Hadid" (the iron pass) indicates that the deposit of iron has long been known, but there is no sign that it was worked before the first small-scale attempts in 1840. At this time the lake's surface elevation would have reached 16 metres (52 ft) in winter, with an area of 14,000 hectares (35,000 acres). The lake was bordered with reeds and rushes, used for nesting by migratory birds, and was rich in fish.

The lake was considered a source of fever, and a 16 kilometres (9.9 mi) drainage channel flowing into the Oued Meboudja was proposed, but although the Société Générale Algérienne (SGA) had rights to the northern and eastern shores of the lake it did nothing. In the 1870s the mining company planted many eucalyptus trees around the Lake of Fetzara, but they were all killed by salt water seeping from the lake. (Note: A report published in 1901 said, "The example of Lake Fetzara has been much quoted; its marshy miasma infected the large mining works of Mokta-el-Hadid, decimated the staff, and rendered existence in this locality insupportable. Now, thanks to well developed forests of Eucalyptus, it presents all the conditions of a tolerable hygiene." The report then noted that the improvement could also be attributed in part to better medical attention and the fact that most of the staff commuted to work from Bône.) In 1877 the Mokta El Hadid company gained permission to drain the lake in exchange for free transfer of the reclaimed land. A channel led from the center of the lake, crossed the 22 metres (72 ft) western flank and led to the Meboudja. The surface elevation had dropped to 12 metres (39 ft) by 1880, but the lake remained swampy in summer. After 1903 the company ceded its rights to the Lake of Fetzara to the SGA colony, which took over the work and completed it in 1935.

== Soil quality ==
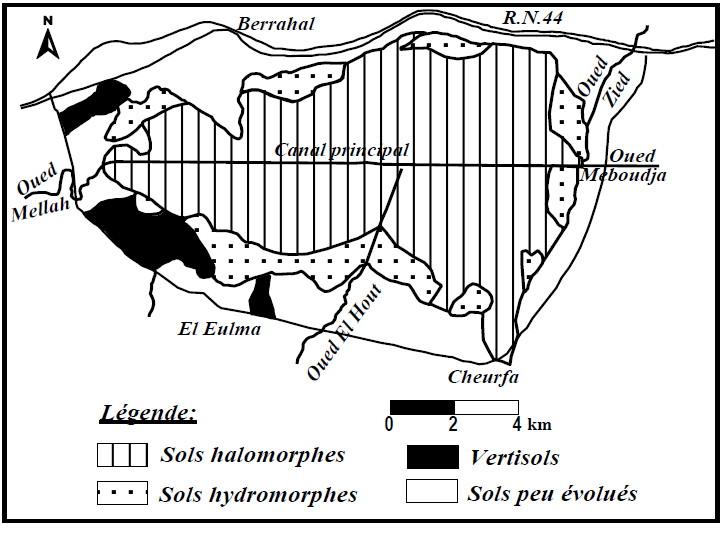
Distribution of soils classes of Fetzara Lake

The soil quality has been defined as the result of its physical, chemical and biological properties, which allows growth and crop development, regulation and the score of water flow through the environment and acting as filter pump towards the pollutants. The soil quality reflects its ability to retain and to release water and nutrients to maintain its biodiversity and resisting to effects of practices that can lead to its degradation. It is obvious that soil quality towards a given use depends on the intrinsic properties of the geochemical environment and climate and its use by humans.

=== Characteristics ===
The soils of Fetzara Lake have been the subject of several studies for agricultural development, all of which revealed any significant constraints on their use such as salinization and hydromorphy [1, 2, 3, and 7]. These studies have helped to classify the soils into four classes: the less evolved soils of non-climate origin resulting from erosion, colluvial and alluvial deposits, the vertisols; alluvial deposits with high clay content as the drought comes easy to cracking; hydromorphic soils and halomorphic soils with high salinity.

=== Material and methods ===
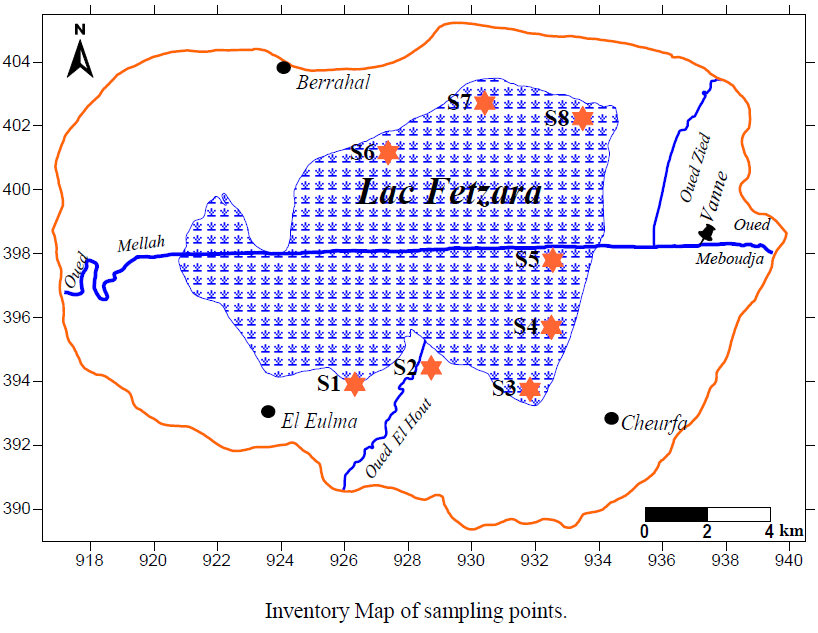
Inventory Map of sampling points-

The sampling was performed on the first two layers (0 – 20 cm and 20 – 40 cm) because, at this level, takes place the most important ions exchange. They were made at eight points around of Fetzara Lake or a total of 16 samples.

The soil samples were dried to fresh air ground and sieved to 2 mm to obtain the fine particles that will be used for all chemical and physicochemical analysis. The soil analysis carried out concerning the density, porosity, carbon and organic matter, pH, electrical conductivity and soluble salts. These characteristics are obtained with the current methods of analysis in soil science.

=== Results and discussion ===
==== The physical properties of the soils ====
The soil physical properties affected by soluble salts are reflected by the notable modifications. Soil structure of Fetzara Lake is of prismatic type to columnar tendency, these characteristics are those of the soil affected by salinity. The soil of the Fetzara Lake are characterized by a real density of about 2.31 g/cm3, an average porosity of about 33%, permeability in most cases less than 2 cm / h, the pH is slightly acidic to alkaline (5.65 to 7.93), and an organic matter content highly variable (0.26 to 7.67%) [10]. Their evolution is closely related to the water cycle, by flooding of winter and summer dewatering.

==== Study of soil salinity ====
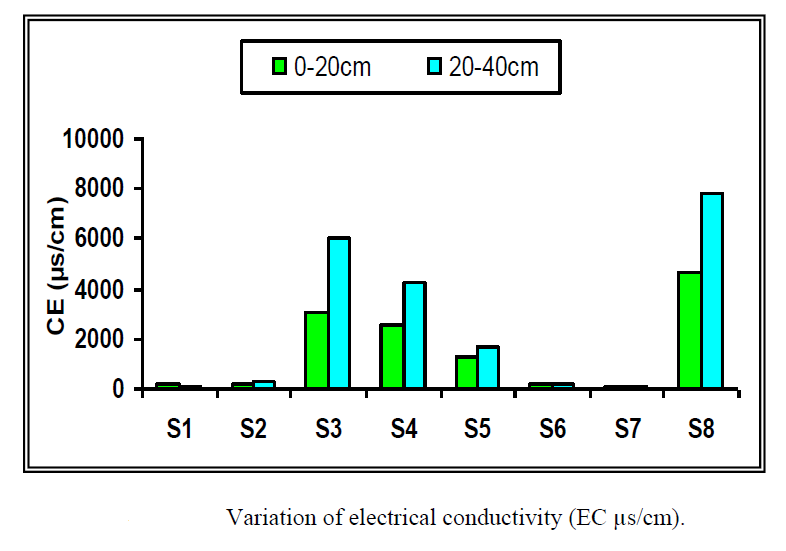
Variation of electrical conductivity

The previous studies show that the salinity is particularly important in the north, in the east and in the southeast of Fetzara Lake. The West and the center of the lake seems to be the areas slightly affected by salts due to movement of salts towards the periphery with desalination of the center Lake [7]. The Average of electrical conductivity of soil solution in the lake is about 1534 μs/cm for the layer 0–20 cm, and 2577 μs/cm for the other layer 20–40 cm, indicating a very large variation between the two layers with a high concentration of soluble salts in depth.

The Soil can be affected by the problem of salinity due to presence of excessive concentrations of soluble salts, sodium or both at once. The soluble salts concerned are essentially, Ca++, Mg++, K+, Na+, Cl-, SO4—and HCO3- (Table 2).

==== Principal component analysis ====
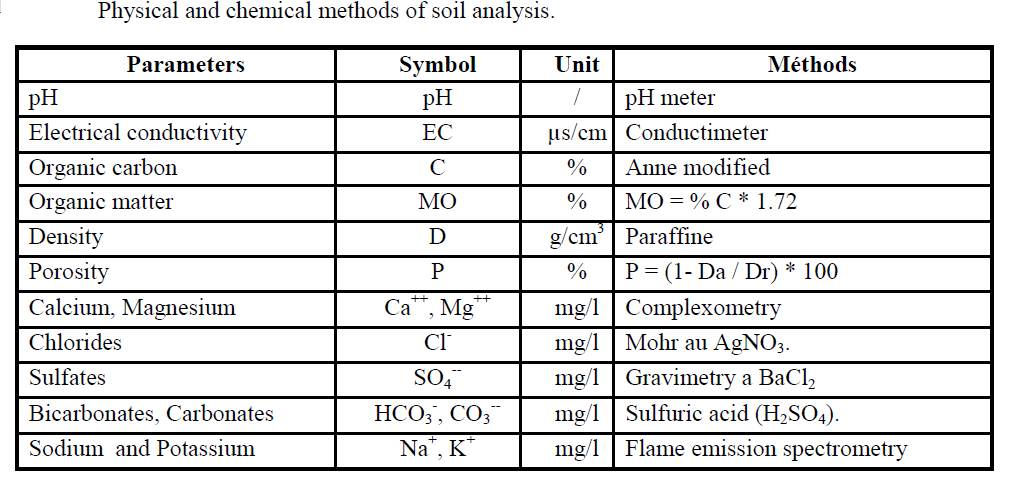
Physical and chemical methods of soil analysis

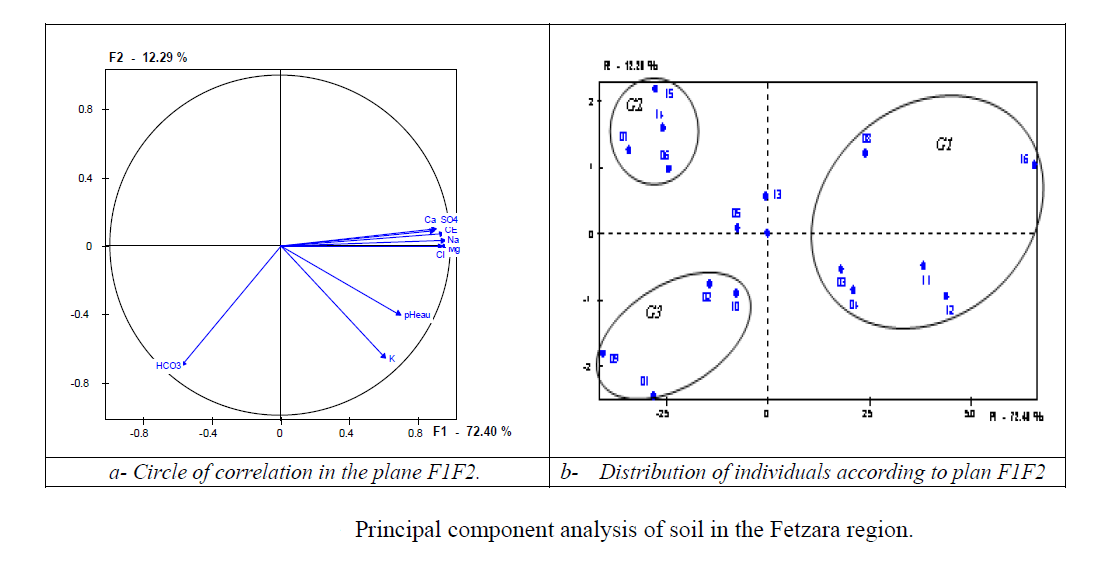
Principal component analysis of soil in the Fetzara region

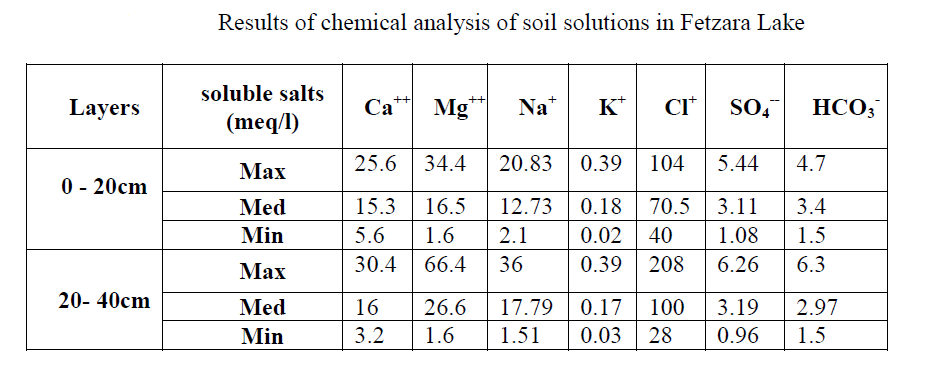
Results of chemical analysis of soil solutions in Fetzara Lake

The observation of the correlation circle formed by the two axes F1 and F2, we show that the factor F1 expresses 72.40% of the variance (Figure 5). On this axis, the soluble salts (Ca++, Mg++, Na+, Cl-, SO4—and EC) are opposed to HCO3-which represents the carbonate alkalinity. This is an axis which probably reflects at the same time the phenomenon of salinization affecting certain types of soils and an alkalinization that develop on other [10].

The second axis F2, which represents 12.29% of the variance, opposes the soluble salts to the alkalinity, pH and K+. It may reflect the processes of salinization and alkalinization. But also the phenomenon of fixation of K+ by some clay minerals is not being ruled out. The distribution of individuals allows us to visualize three groups of associations; the first group G1 (S3, S4, S8, S11, S12 and S16) is characterized by mineralized solutions, it is opposed to the second group G2 (S6, S7, S14 and S15) representing the less mineralized solutions. The third group G3 (S1, S2, S9 and S10) includes the solutions loaded with bicarbonate.

== Sources ==
- Agence Japonaise de Coopération Internationale. Etude de la faisabilité du projet d'aménagement agricole de la région périphérique du Lac Fetzara. (1985) Vol. 3.
- Badraoui, M., Soudi, B., Farhat, A. Variation de la qualité des sols : une base pour évaluer la durabilité de la mise en valeur agricole sous irrigation par pivot au Maroc. Institut Agronomique et Vétérinaire Hassan II, Rabat, Maroc. (1998) pp 227–233.
- Belhamra, A. Contrôle de la salinité des eaux du lac Fetzara jusqu'à la mer. Mémoire de Magister, option : Biologie et physiologie des organismes Marins. Univ. Annaba, (2001) 110 p.
- Davis, Diana K. (2007-09-11), Resurrecting the Granary of Rome: Environmental History and French Colonial Expansion in North Africa, Ohio University Press, ISBN 978-0-8214-1751-5
- Direction générale des forets. Atlas des 26 zones humides Algériennes d'importance internationale, Algérie. (2002) p 53-55.
- Djamai, R. Contribution à l'étude de la salinité des sols et des eaux du lac Fetzara (Annaba). Mémoire de Magister, option : Science Agronomiques. INA Alger, (1993)78 p. 7.
- Durand, J. Premiers résultats de l'étude des sols du lac Fetzara. Doc inédit; SES Alger, (1950) 112 p.
- Habes, S. Pollution saline d'un lac, cas du lac Fetzara, Est Algérien. Mémoire de Magister, option : Hydrogéologie. Univ. Annaba, (2006) 103 p. 7.
- Ifagraria. Etude générale de la mise en valeur agricole des plaines côtières d'Annaba. Soc Ifagraria, Rome; partie I, (1967) 169 p.
- Iron and Steel Institute (1880), "Africa", The Journal of the Iron and Steel Institute, The Institute
- Mining Journal (1878), "Iron Ore", Dictionary of Arts, Manufactures and Mines
- Tommasi-Crudeli (1903), "Blue Gum. (Eucalyptus Globulus, Labill.)", Bulletin of Miscellaneous Information (Royal Botanic Gardens, Kew), 1903 (1), Springer on behalf of Royal Botanic Gardens, Kew, doi:10.2307/4111387, JSTOR 4111387
- Travers, L. (May–June 1958), "LA MISE EN VALEUR DU LAC FETZARA", Annales de Géographie (in French), 67 (361), Armand Colin, JSTOR 23443549
- Zahi, F. la qualité des eaux et des sols de la région du lac Fetzara (Nord-Est Algérien). Mémoire de Magister, option : Géosciences. Université d'Annaba, (2008) 150 p(2011)
- Zenati, N. Relation Nappes - Lac Confirmation par l'hydrochimie cas de la plaine Ouest d'El Hadjar lac Fetzara N-E Algérien. Mémoire de Magister, option : Chimie et Environnement. Univ. Annaba, (1999) 151p.
