= Treat, Algeria =

Treat

- Location within Algeria
- Coordinates: 36°53′51″N 7°25′41″E
- Country: Algeria
- Province: Annaba

Population (2008)
  - Total: 6,076
- Time zone: UTC+1 (West Africa Time)

Treat, Algeria is a town in north-eastern Algeria.

The municipality of Treat is located to the west of the wilaya of Annaba, at 36.91588, 7.41651. Treat is bordered to the south by the sandy plain of the Oued el Kebir (complex of wetlands of Guerbes-Senhadja) and to the north by the forest massif of the peninsula of the Edough.

The central part of the municipality consists of agglomeration, crops and pastures

== Twin cities ==
- (Hungary) Tát
- (France) Bois, Charente-Maritime
