= El Hadjar Complex =

Coordinates: 36.794745°N 7.702875°E

El Hadjar Complex (Arabic: مركب الحجار) is a large steel plant, located in northern Algeria, on the boundary between historical provinces of Annaba and El Taref Province. Current name of the plant is ArcelorMittal Annaba, and its previous names were El Hadjar Iron and Steel Complex, Sider Algeria s.p.a, El Hadjar Iron and Steel Complex is located near the city of El Hadjar.

The decision to build a modern, brand new plant, located in an agricultural area of El Hadjar was taken by Houari Boumediene 1964. The construction was initiated in 1967, and it brought far-reaching changes to the social structure of the region. Thousands of migrants, mostly from eastern Algeria, came to work and live in newly built flats.

Construction of the plant was carried out with cooperation with Soviet experts. Some 50,000 workers took part in the project. First unit of the plant was opened in 1969.
