= Berrahal =

Barrahel
- Location within Algeria
- Coordinates: 36°50′N 7°27′E
- Country: Algeria
- Province: Annaba
- Time zone: UTC+1 (West Africa Time)

Barrahel is a town in north-eastern Algeria.
