= Sidi Amar, Annaba =

Sidi Amar
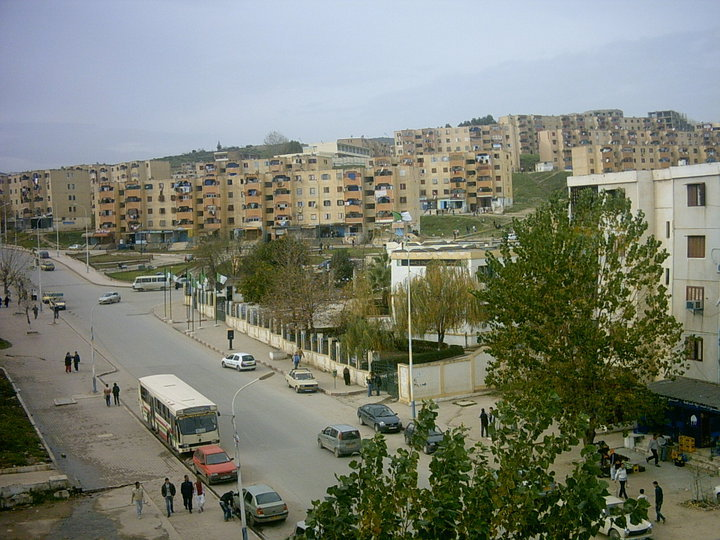

- Location within Algeria
- Coordinates: 36°49′3″N 7°43′4″E
- Country: Algeria
- Province: Annaba

Population (2008)
  - Total: 83,254
- Time zone: UTC+1 (West Africa Time)

Sidi Amar is a town in north-eastern Algeria.
