= Annaba Province =

Province of Algeria

Annaba Province ولاية عنابة
- Province
- Map of Algeria highlighting Annaba
- Coordinates: 36°54′N 7°46′E
- Country: Algeria
- Capital: Annaba

Area
  - Total: 1,439 km^{2} (556 sq mi)

Population (2008)
  - Total: 640,050
  - Density: 444.8/km^{2} (1,152/sq mi)
- Time zone: UTC+01 (CET)
- Area code: +213 (0) 38
- ISO 3166 code: DZ-23
- Districts: 6
- Municipalities: 12

Annaba (Arabic: ولاية عنابة) is a province (wilaya) in the north-eastern corner of Algeria. Its capital, Annaba, is Algeria's main port for mineral exports.

== History ==
In 1984 El Taref Province was carved out from its territory.

== Administrative divisions ==
The province is divided into 6 districts and 12 municipalities.

The districts are:

1. Annaba
2. Aïn El Berda
3. El Hadjar
4. Berrahal
5. Chetaïbi
6. El Bouni

The municipalities are:

1. Annaba
2. Aïn Berda (Aïn El Berda)
3. Barrahel
4. Chetaïbi
5. Cheurfa
6. El Bouni
7. El Hadjar
8. Eulma
9. Oued El Aneb
10. Seraïdi
11. Sidi Amar
12. Treat
