= Chorfa, Annaba =

Coordinates: 36°43′14″N 7°33′15″E

Chorfa
- Interactive map of Chorfa
- Country: Algeria
- Province: Annaba
- Time zone: UTC+1 (West Africa Time)

Cheurfa

Chorfa is a town in north-eastern Algeria.
