= Annaba =

Annaba Arabic: عنابة Tamazight: ⵄⴻⵏⵏⴰⴱⴰ
- City
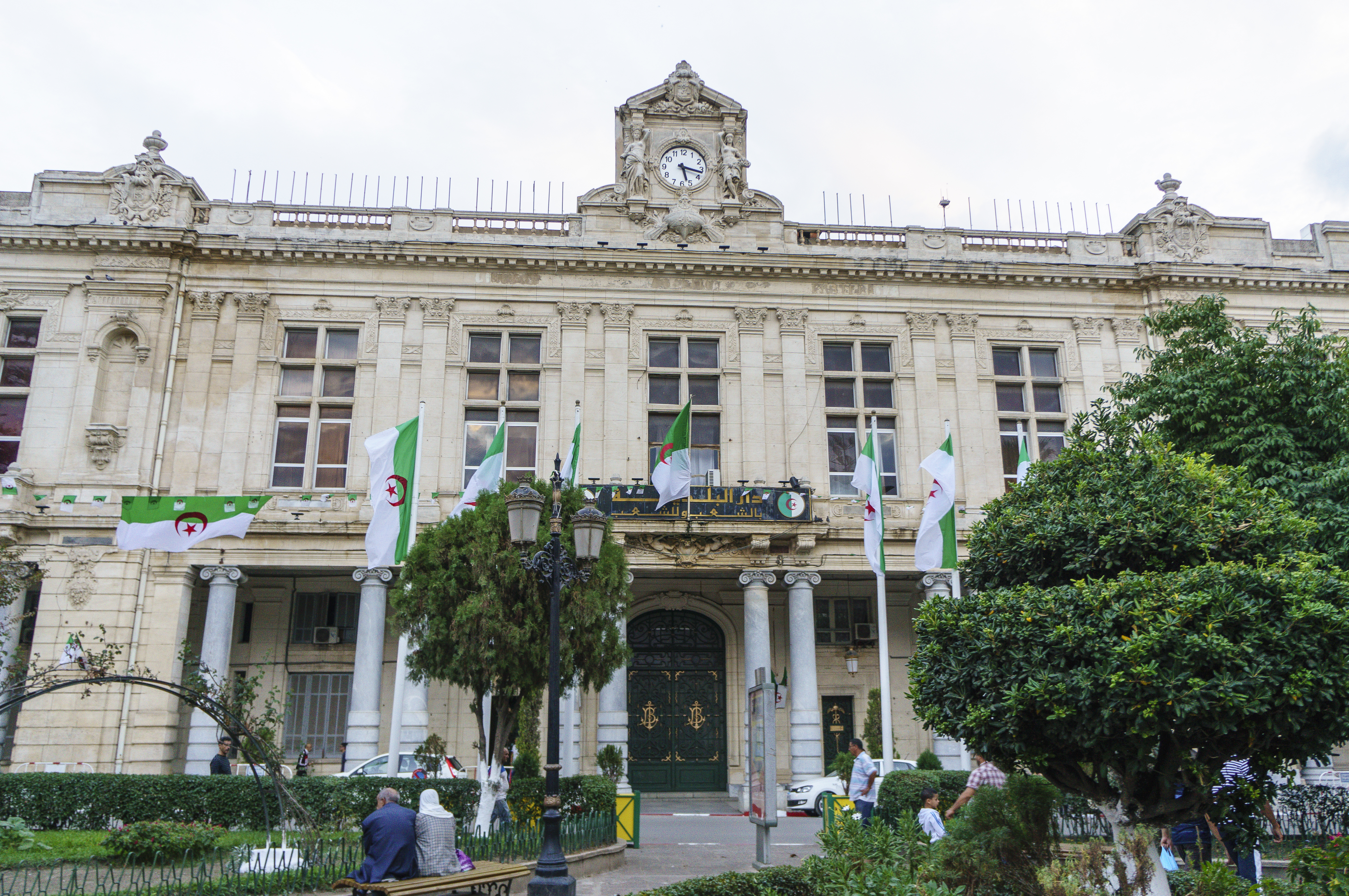
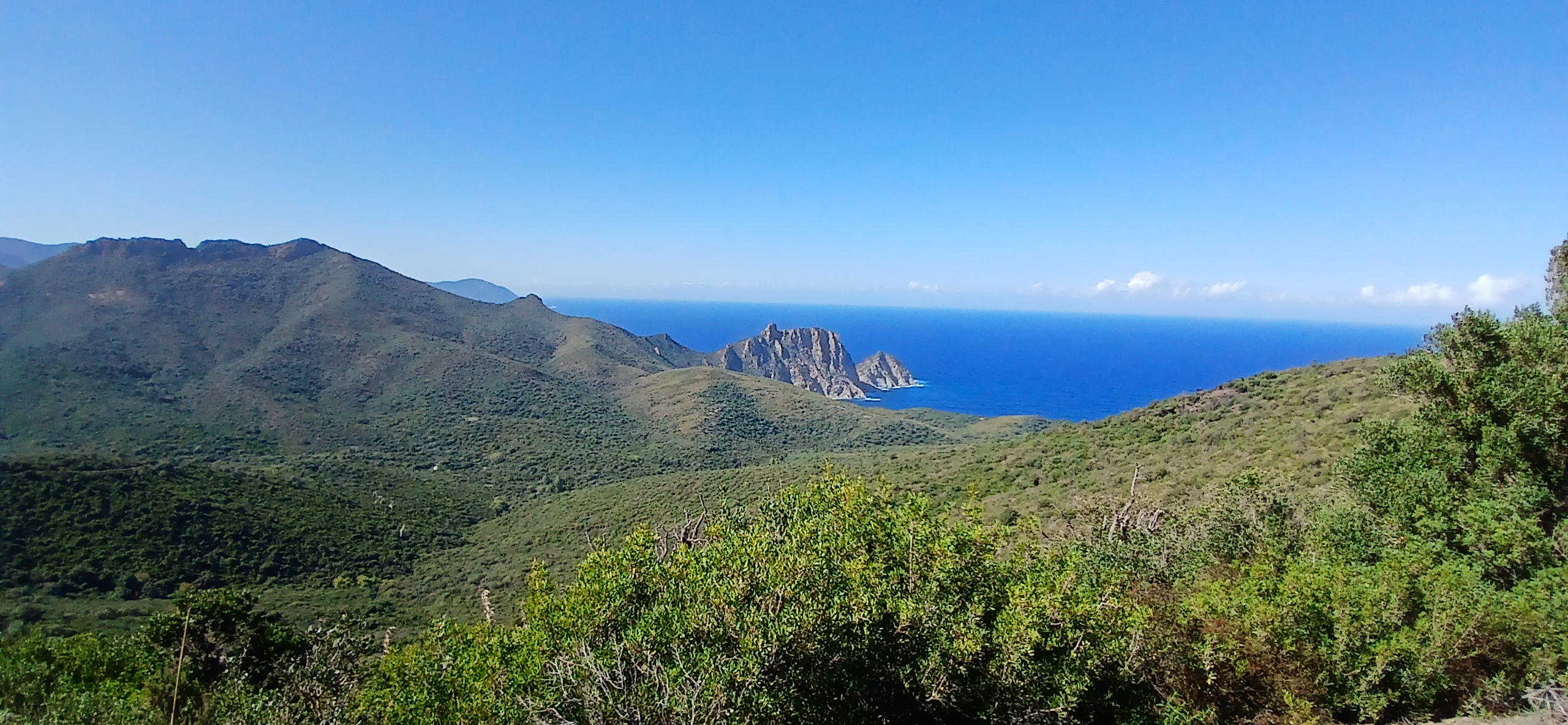
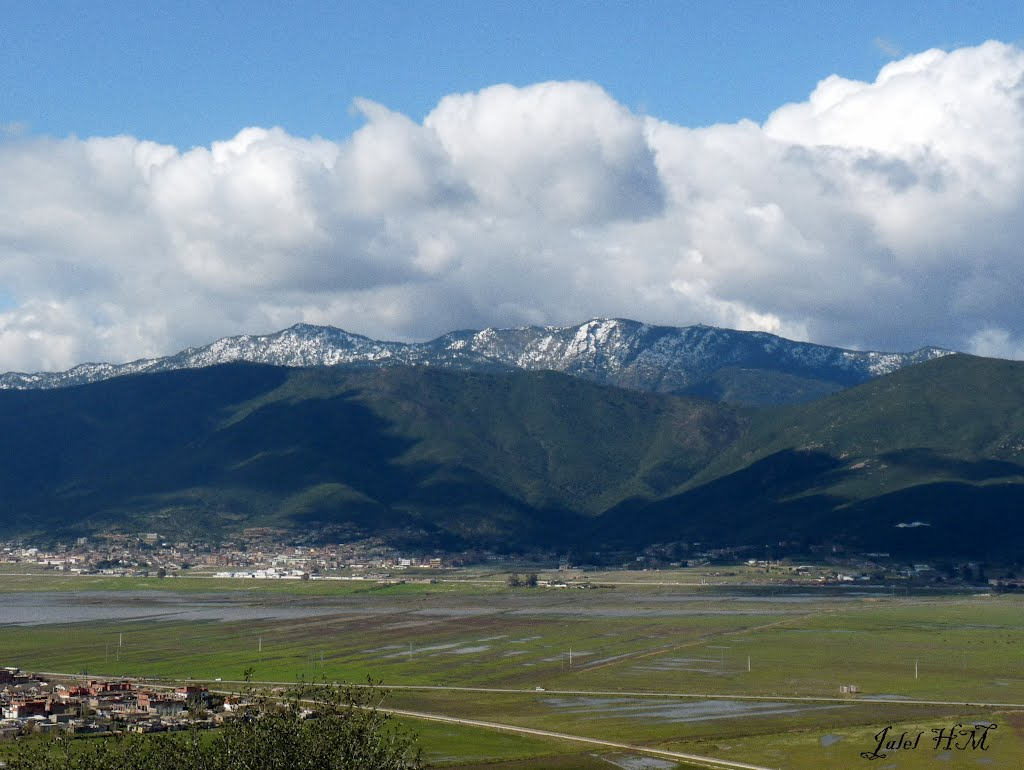
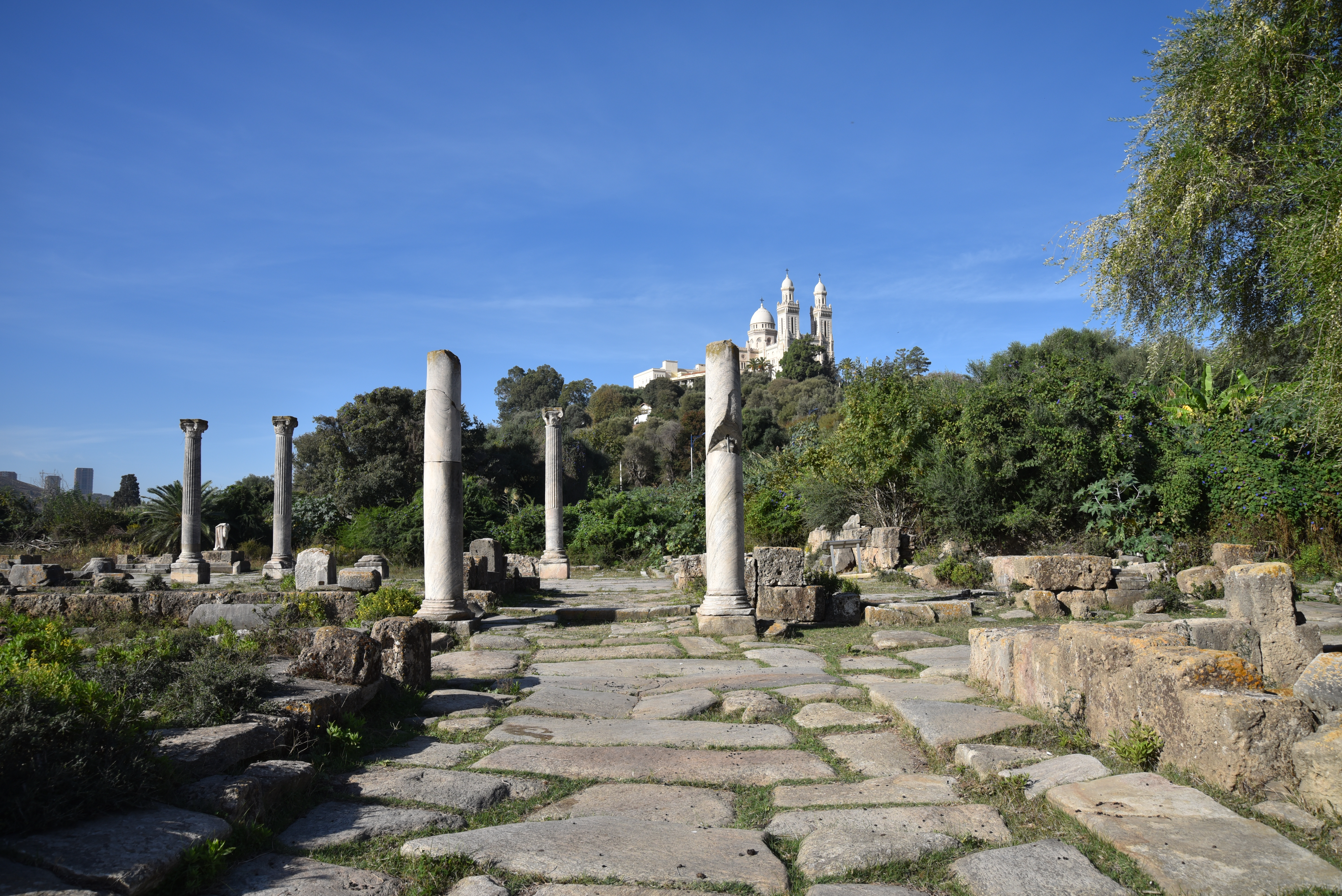
- Basilica of St. Augustine Town Hall Seraïdi Edough Massif Hippo Regius

- Flag
- Nickname: Pearl of the east
- Location of Annaba, Algeria within Annaba Province

- Location within Algeria Annaba (Africa)
- Coordinates: 36°54′N 7°46′E
- Country: Algeria
- Province: Annaba Province
- District: Annaba District

Government
  - Mayor: Aymen Fri

Area
  - Total: 49 km^{2} (19 sq mi)
- Elevation: 3 m (9.8 ft)

Population (2019)
  - Total: 464,740
  - Density: 9,500/km^{2} (25,000/sq mi)
- Demonym: Annabi
- Time zone: UTC+1 (CET)
- Postal code: 23000
- Area code: +213 (0)38
- Climate: Csa

Annaba (Arabic: عنابة, romanized: ʕannāba, lit. 'place of the Jujubes', Tamazight: ⵄⴻⵏⵏⴰⴱⴰ, romanized: Ɛenaba), formerly known as Hippone, Bona and Bône, is a seaport city in the northeastern corner of Algeria, close to the border with Tunisia. Annaba is near the small Seybouse River and is in Annaba Province. With a population of about 263,650 (2019) and 1,000,000 for the metropolitan area, Annaba is the third-largest city and the leading industrial centre in Algeria.

Annaba is a coastal city that underwent significant growth during the 20th century. Annaba has a metropolitan area with a higher population density than the other metropolitan areas of the Algerian coastline, such as Oran and Algiers. Much of eastern and southern Algeria uses the services, equipment and infrastructure of Annaba. Economically, it is the centre for various economic activities, such as industry, transportation, finance, and tourism.

== Names ==
Present-day Annaba grew up on the site of Aphrodisium, the seaport of the Roman city Hippo Regius. (The modern city has since expanded south over Hippo's ruins as well.) Its former names Bône and Bona derived from "Ubbo", a local form of the name Hippo. Its informal name "Land of the Jujubes" (بلد العناب, Balad al-‘Unnāb) derives from the abundance of that fruit in the region.

== History ==
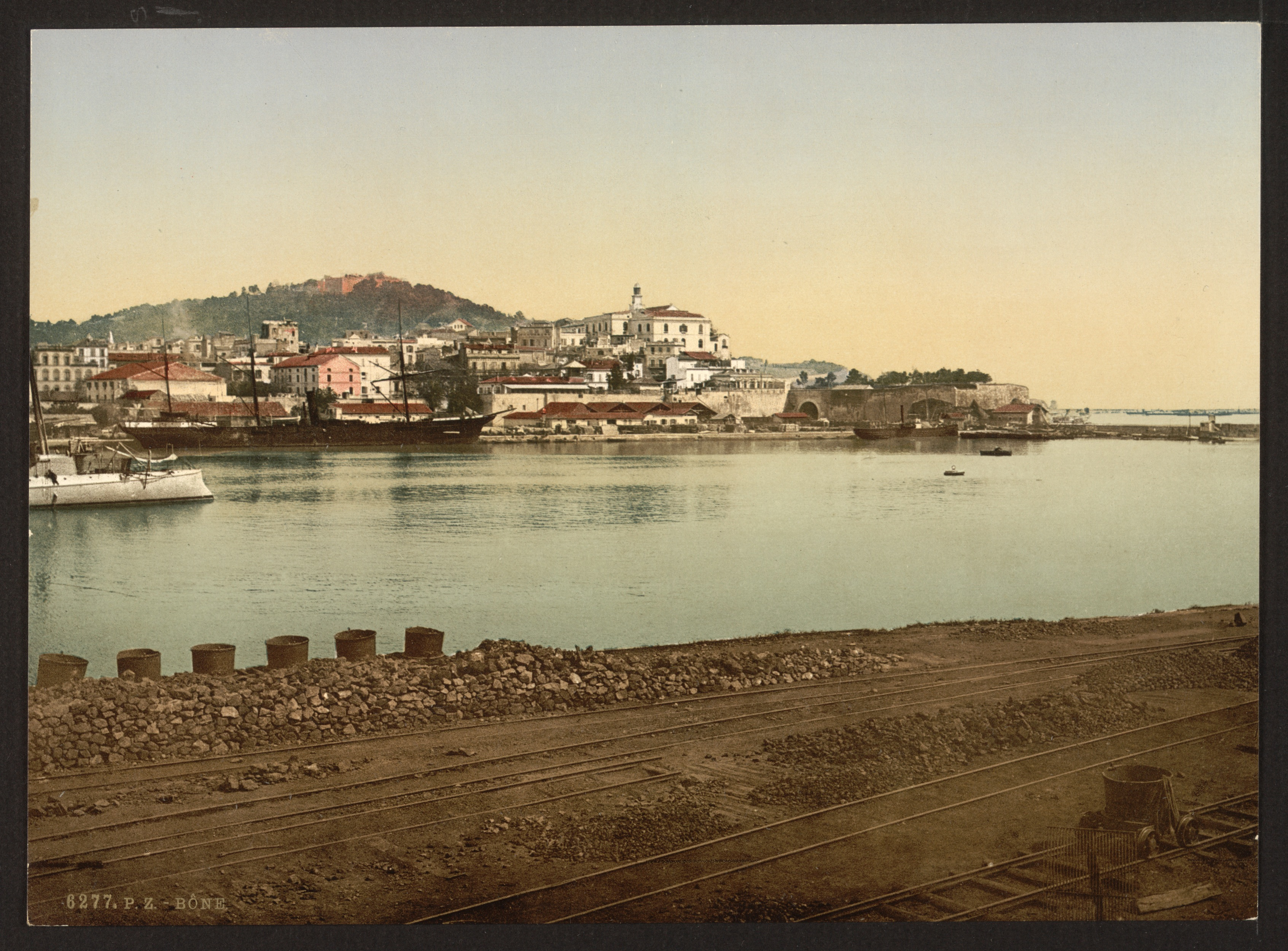
Bona, Algeria, 1899

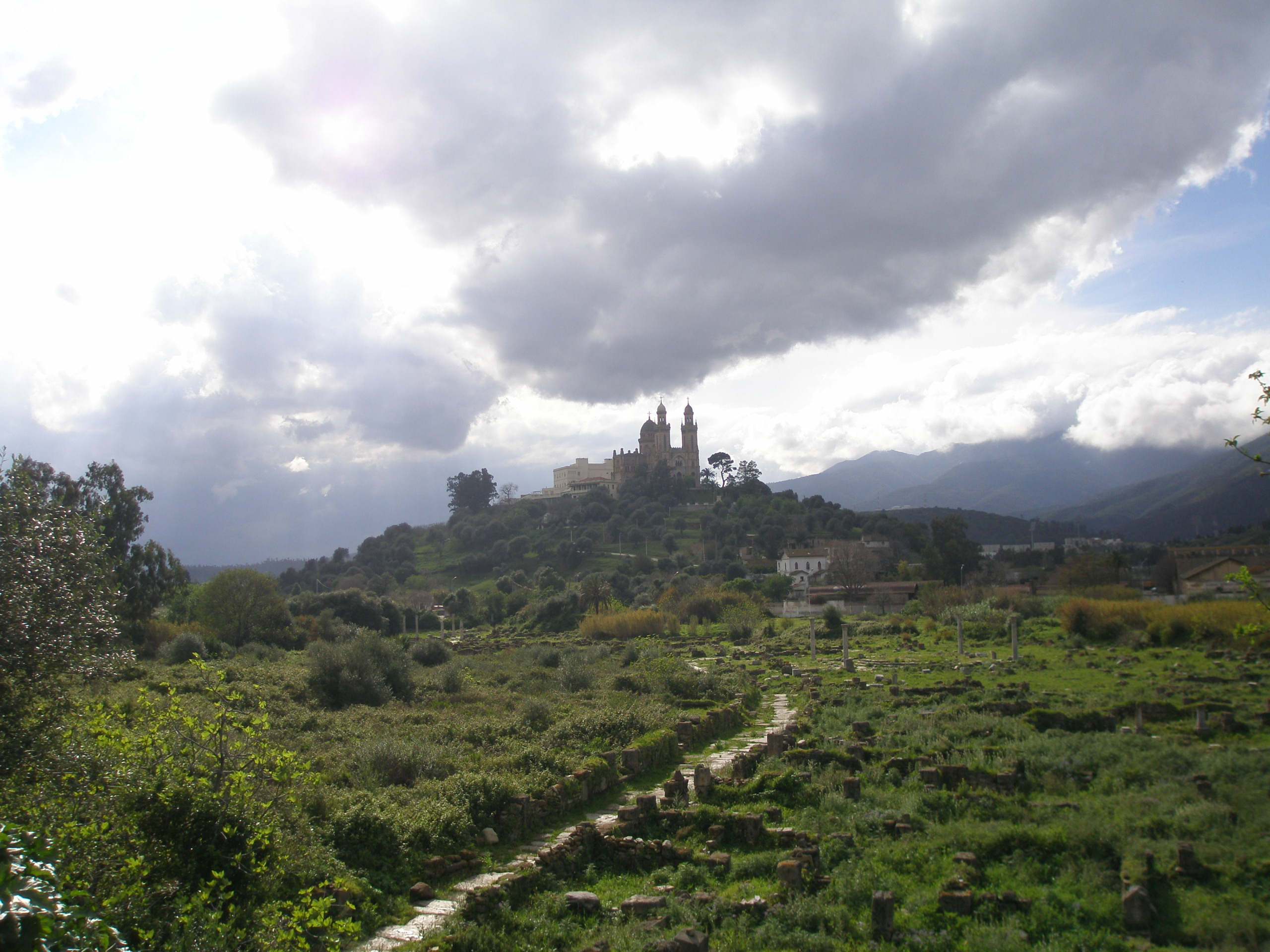
Ancient city of Hippo Regius, today Annaba

=== Ancient ===
The area of Annaba has yielded evidence of very early human occupation at Ain el Hanech, near Saïda (circa 200,000 BC), including artifacts that show remarkable toolmaking craftsmanship. According to some sources, prehistoric Algeria was the site of the most advanced development of flake-tool techniques in the Middle Early Stone Age (Middle Paleolithic).

The town of Hippo Regius (modern Annaba) first entered historical records at the end of the 3rd century BC as a possession of Massinissa's Numidian Kingdom. Augustine of Hippo was bishop here from 396 AD until his death in 430 AD. The city was destroyed in the 5th century by the Vandals. Vandals ruled the city for roughly a century until 534. Gelimer, the King of the Vandals and Alans from 530 to 534 AD, faced with the starvation of his followers and their children, and realizing he had no chance of regaining his kingdom of North Africa, surrendered to Flavius Belisarius, a general of the Byzantine Empire under Justinian I, at Bône. Byzantines then ruled Hippona (Hippo's new name after 395) before the Muslim conquest of the Maghreb in 699 AD. Later, Abbasids, Aghlabids, and Fatimids ruled Bona before the rise of the Zirids. It was relocated to its present place after flooding and Banu Hilal the ravages that occurred in 1033 during Hammadid rule. It was attacked by a Pisan fleet in 1034 and was conquered by Kingdom of Sicily in 1153. The Almohads took it in 1160.

Al-Bakri, in the 11th century, wrote about the city:

Bona is an ancient city, it is the city of Augustine, the scholar of Christianity. It is located on the coast of the sea, on a high and fortified piece of land overlooking the city of Seboussa. Today, it is called the city of Zawa, and it is about three miles away from the modern city. It has mosques, markets, and a public bath. The land is fertile, with fruits and crops. The modern city of Bona was surrounded by walls after the year 450 [Hijri year]. In the modern city of Bona, there is a well by the sea, carved in solid rock, called the well of Nithra, from which most of the inhabitants drink.

During the 11th century, the Banu Hilal, an Arab tribe living between the Nile and the Red Sea, settled in Tunisia, Tripolitania (western Libya) and Constantinois (eastern Algeria) which was the portion known as Annaba.

After the demise of the Almohads, the rule of the Hafsids began in Annaba in 1250. Hafsid rule was interrupted by brief occupations of the Marinids and Castile (in 1360) and ended with that of the Zayyanids. Rule by the Ottoman Empire began in 1533, and that lasted until French occupation in 1832, excepting rule by the Spanish Empire between 1535 and 1540. The Barbary pirates also lived in Annaba from the 16th through 19th centuries.

=== Modern ===
During the rule of France (empire and republics), this city was called Bône. It was one of the main French settlements, and it still has a sizeable minority of the "Pied-Noir". One notable pied-noir from Bône was Marshal Alphonse Juin, a very senior French military commander and then the Central European NATO Commander.

Construction was undertaken at Bône during 1856–69 to build an 80-hectare (200-acre) sheltered port to handle the iron ore from the Mokta el Hadid. A short railroad line was built from the iron ore mine at Ain Mokra to the docks of Bône. This railway was opened in 1864, the first one to be built in Algeria. Full-scale production or iron ore began in 1865. Also in 1865, Emperor Napoleon III visited Algeria, including going to the mine and the city of Bône.

In 1865, the mine produced 22,000 tonnes of iron ore, which increased to 255,000 tonnes in 1869. The ore was extracted from underground galleries, and then shipped from Bône to the French iron and steel works. Before the mine was opened, Bône had just 10,000 inhabitants. By 1924, there were 41,000 people, and the port was being used to export phosphates, lead ore, and zinc ore, too.

During World War II in 1943, Bône was an important goal of the U.S. Army and British Army in Operation Torch, advancing eastward from Morocco, Oran, and Algiers across North Africa. Bône was a crucial highway and sea location for the invasion of Tunisia, and thence the driving of the Axis powers (Germany and Italy) out of Africa in May 1943.

Bône remained in Allied hands until the end of the war in 1945, and then it remained a part of French Algeria until the independence of Algeria in 1962.

== Geography ==
The city is located in the northeastern corner of Algeria, close to the border with Tunisia. Annaba is near the small Seybouse River and is in located in the Annaba Province.

=== Urban areas ===
The metropolitan area includes the cities of El Bouni, El Hadjar in the northeast, and Sidi Amar, which now form a circle around the city of Annaba. The city has grown dramatically since a major factory was opened at El Hadjar (10 km (6.2 mi) to the South) and provides employment for the entire region.

The downtown district of Annaba is on the sea-front, and includes the promenade called the Concours de la Revolution (previously called Le Cours Bertagna) which is a lively area, brimming with arcades and all kinds of covered restaurants, terraced cafes and kiosks. Annaba also has an international airport.

=== Climate ===
Annaba has a hot-summer Mediterranean climate (Csa in the Köppen climate classification) with long, hot, dry summers, especially from mid-July to mid-August, and mild, extremely wet winters. Snow is rare but not unknown. Rain is abundant by North African standards and can be torrential.

Climate data for Annaba (Rabah Bitat Airport) (1991–2020, extremes 1957–present)
Month	Jan	Feb	Mar	Apr	May	Jun	Jul	Aug	Sep	Oct	Nov	Dec	Year
Record high °C (°F)	27.2 (81.0)	30.0 (86.0)	36.8 (98.2)	37.9 (100.2)	41.1 (106.0)	44.0 (111.2)	48.2 (118.8)	47.0 (116.6)	44.3 (111.7)	41.0 (105.8)	37.1 (98.8)	29.0 (84.2)	48.2 (118.8)
Mean daily maximum °C (°F)	16.5 (61.7)	16.7 (62.1)	18.9 (66.0)	21.0 (69.8)	24.3 (75.7)	28.1 (82.6)	30.9 (87.6)	31.8 (89.2)	29.1 (84.4)	26.2 (79.2)	21.3 (70.3)	17.7 (63.9)	23.5 (74.3)
Daily mean °C (°F)	11.8 (53.2)	11.7 (53.1)	13.6 (56.5)	15.6 (60.1)	18.7 (65.7)	22.4 (72.3)	25.1 (77.2)	26.1 (79.0)	23.9 (75.0)	20.8 (69.4)	16.2 (61.2)	13.0 (55.4)	18.2 (64.8)
Mean daily minimum °C (°F)	7.0 (44.6)	6.8 (44.2)	8.4 (47.1)	10.2 (50.4)	13.2 (55.8)	16.6 (61.9)	19.3 (66.7)	20.4 (68.7)	18.6 (65.5)	15.3 (59.5)	11.1 (52.0)	8.2 (46.8)	12.9 (55.2)
Record low °C (°F)	−2.0 (28.4)	−2.0 (28.4)	0.0 (32.0)	1.0 (33.8)	2.8 (37.0)	8.0 (46.4)	11.0 (51.8)	11.0 (51.8)	10.0 (50.0)	6.5 (43.7)	0.0 (32.0)	−4.0 (24.8)	−4.0 (24.8)
Average precipitation mm (inches)	100.4 (3.95)	88.3 (3.48)	80.1 (3.15)	62.9 (2.48)	47.7 (1.88)	10.9 (0.43)	2.6 (0.10)	11.3 (0.44)	55.2 (2.17)	71.7 (2.82)	126.2 (4.97)	115.6 (4.55)	772.9 (30.43)
Average precipitation days (≥ 1.0 mm)	10.3	10.2	8.2	8.0	4.7	2.0	0.6	1.8	7.2	7.2	15.0	10.8	84.0
Average relative humidity (%)	77	76	75	76	76	74	69	72	73	74	76	78	75
Mean monthly sunshine hours	139.5	163.9	198.4	204.0	260.4	300.0	350.3	316.2	249.0	201.5	153.0	136.4	2,672.6
Mean daily sunshine hours	4.5	5.8	6.4	6.8	8.4	10.0	11.3	10.2	8.3	6.5	5.1	4.4	7.3
Source 1: NOAA
Source 2: Deutscher Wetterdienst (humidity, 1968–1990 and sun, 1952–1990), Meteo Climat (record highs and lows)

== Demography ==
Historical population
Year	Pop.	±% p.a.
1882	22,000	—
1886	29,600	+7.70%
1892	30,800	+0.66%
1896	32,300	+1.20%
1899	34,500	+2.22%
1901	37,000	+3.56%
1906	42,900	+3.00%
1911	42,000	−0.42%
1921	45,200	+0.74%
1926	51,900	+2.80%
1931	68,800	+5.80%
1936	83,300	+3.90%
1948	102,800	+1.77%
1954	114,100	+1.75%
1960	164,000	+6.23%
1966	168,800	+0.48%
1974	213,200	+2.96%
1977	222,600	+1.45%
1987	222,500	−0.00%
1998	247,701	+0.98%
2008	257,359	+0.38%
Source: www.populstat.info

The city of Annaba had a population of 257,359 in 2008 (General Census of the population and habitat). In 1988, the population of the urban district of Annaba had increased to 359,657 (with El Bouni comprising 111,956 inhabitants). The cities of If El Hadjar, and Sidi Amar are also included. Currently there are approximately 500,000 people in "greater Annaba". Today Annaba has a population of 464,740 and 1,000,000 in greater Annaba.

== Education ==
One of Annaba's most notable educational institutions is the University of Annaba. As of 2004, there are over 40,000 students enrolled.

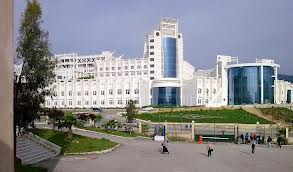
University of Annaba

There is a branch campus of the French international school Lycée international Alexandre-Dumas.

== Economy ==
As of 1911, Annaba was producing iron, zinc, cork, livestock, and cereal.

The city is an important hub of the world steel industry with the steel complex of El Hadjar, 8 kilometres (5.0 mi) south of the city. It is the largest in Africa. Phosphate and metal industries now include the Seybousa complex and the metallurgical complex of Allelik. The private industrial sector is also very important in Annaba and geared especially to the agri-food, metal processing, wood products and construction industries. These industrial areas occupy nearly 400 hectares (990 acres) between Bouchet Bridge, Meboudja, Berrahal and Kherraza. Business areas are also to be found in the suburbs of the city, such as Sidi Salem, El Eulma and Wadi El-Aneb.

== Transportation ==
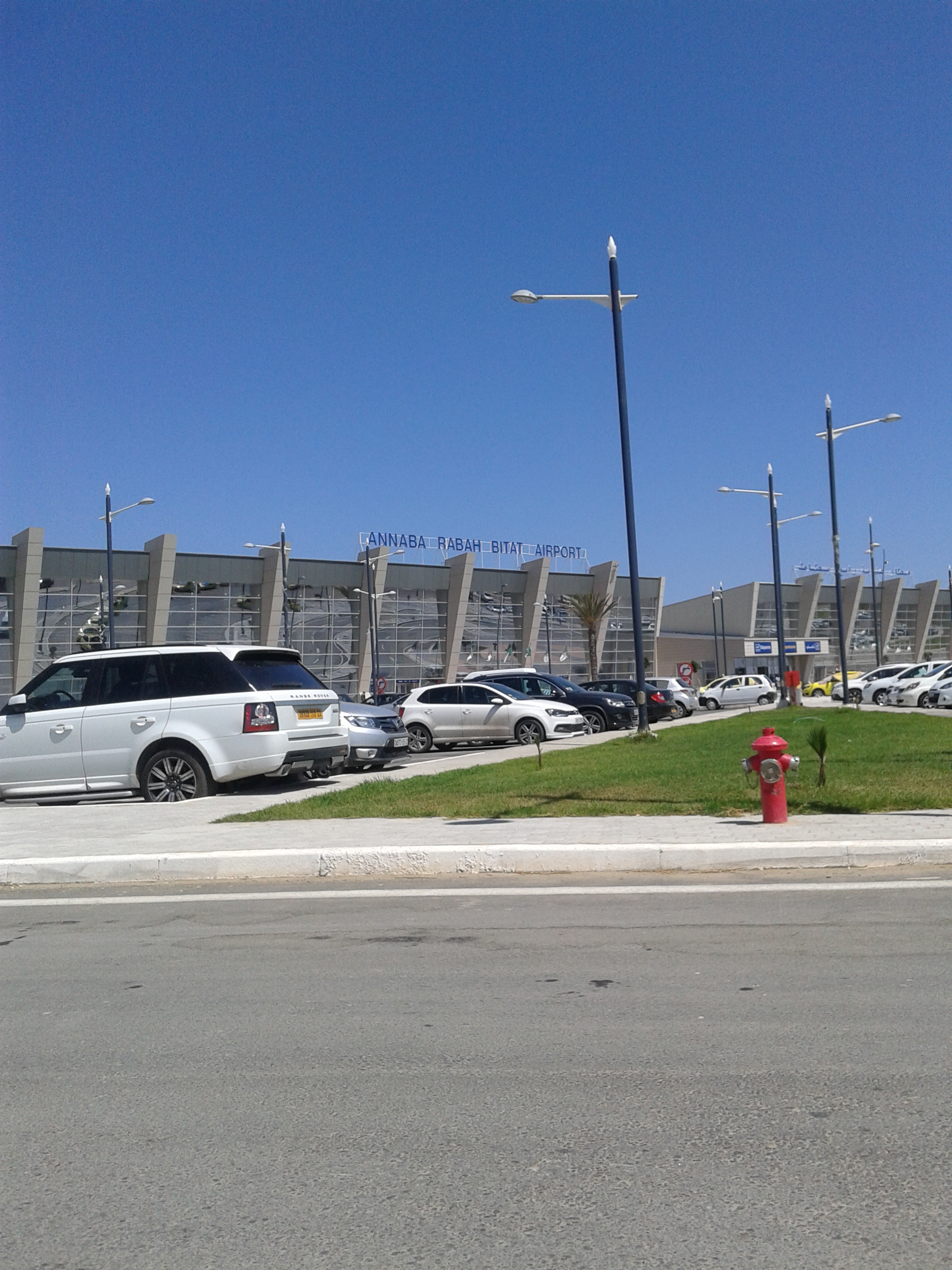
Rabah Bitat Airport

Annaba was described as the "chief seaport of Algeria after Oran and Algiers," by Baedeker's in 1911.

Annaba is served by Rabah Bitat Airport, an international airport whose IATA airport code is AAE. Annaba also has rail links to the Algerian cities of Constantine and Algiers, and it is at the end of Algeria's east–west highway. It is the second industrial centre in Algeria after the capital Algiers.

== Tourism ==
Annaba is an important centre for tourism, and is one of the major tourist attractions in the western Mediterranean. It is a coastal city with mountains, hills, foothills, and plains surrounding it. Due to this, and aside from maritime and seaside tourism, Annaba has a key potential for mountain tourism. The mountains around Seraïdi which rise to 1,080 metres (3,540 ft), make them a major tourist attraction. Other tourist attractions are West Bay, Djenane el Bey (La Grande Plage), Ras el Hamra and Ain Achir beach.

Annaba also has various key religious sites, including the Saint Augustin Basilica. Annaba in its early history, was the site of an important and influential Diocese, prior to its destruction by the Vandals, and the era of Islamisation. Annaba is located on the Tunisian border, and is a visa-free area, hence tourists are also able to make side trips to Tunisia and to El Kala National Park.

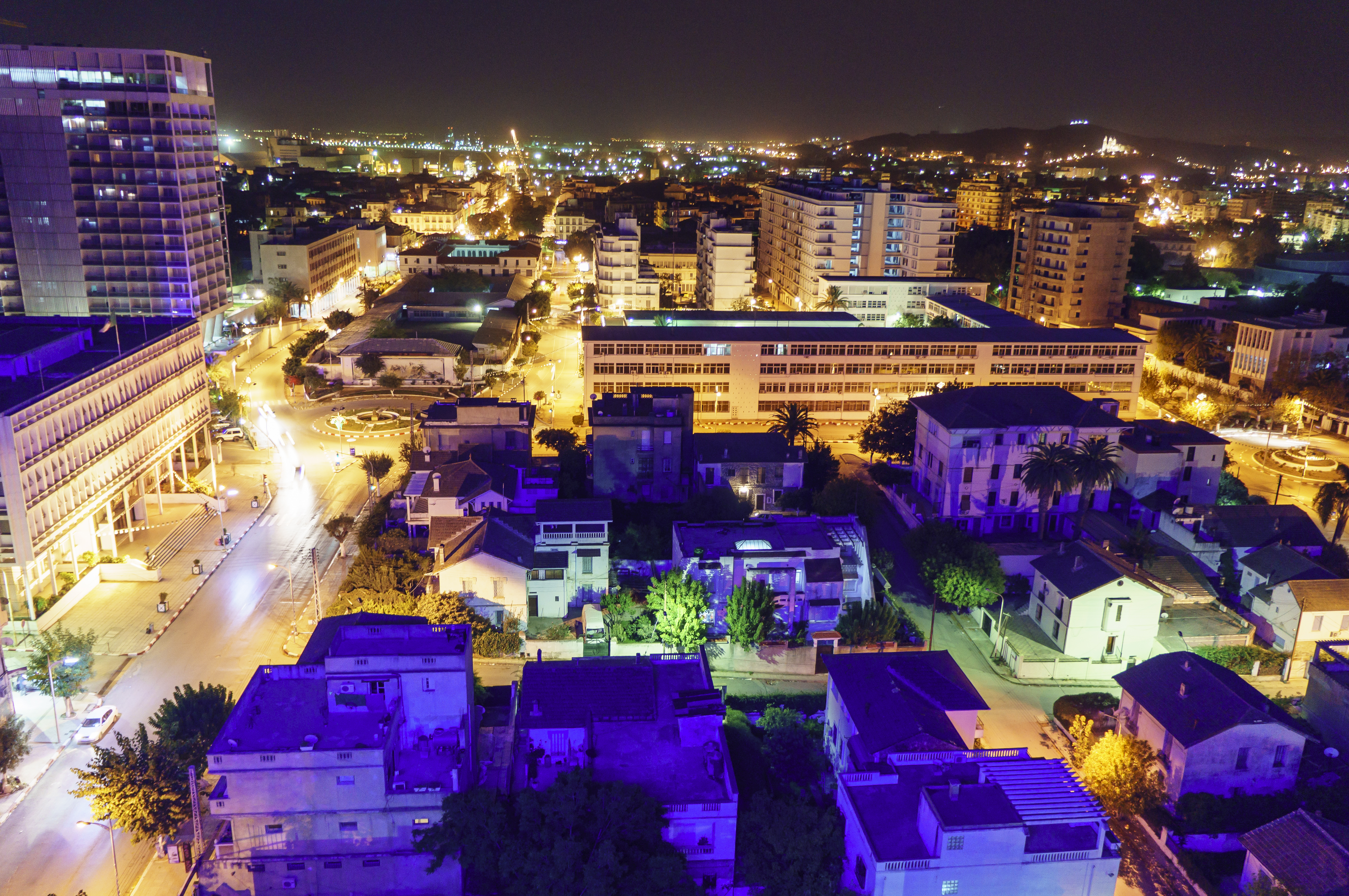
City of Annaba in the night

Annaba is also known for its verdant Main Street, also known as the 'Concours de la Revolution', which is a promenade known for its night-life. The Annaba area is generally reputed for having beaches, hotels and a nightlife.

The War Cemetery at Bône lies 5 kilometres (3.1 mi) from Annaba on the road towards Constantine. It is an important memorial to the British Empire's soldiers and airmen who fought in the region during the World War II, with 868 Commonwealth burials there. There are also 14 other graves, mostly of merchant seamen. It was designed by J. Hubert Worthington. After the war, most of the American dead were repatriated for burial in the United States, but this was not traditional in the British Empire.

== International relations ==
=== Twin towns – sister cities ===
Annaba is twinned with:

- Yekaterinburg, Russia
- Saint-Étienne, France
- Dunkirk, France
- Bizerte, Tunisia

== Notable people ==
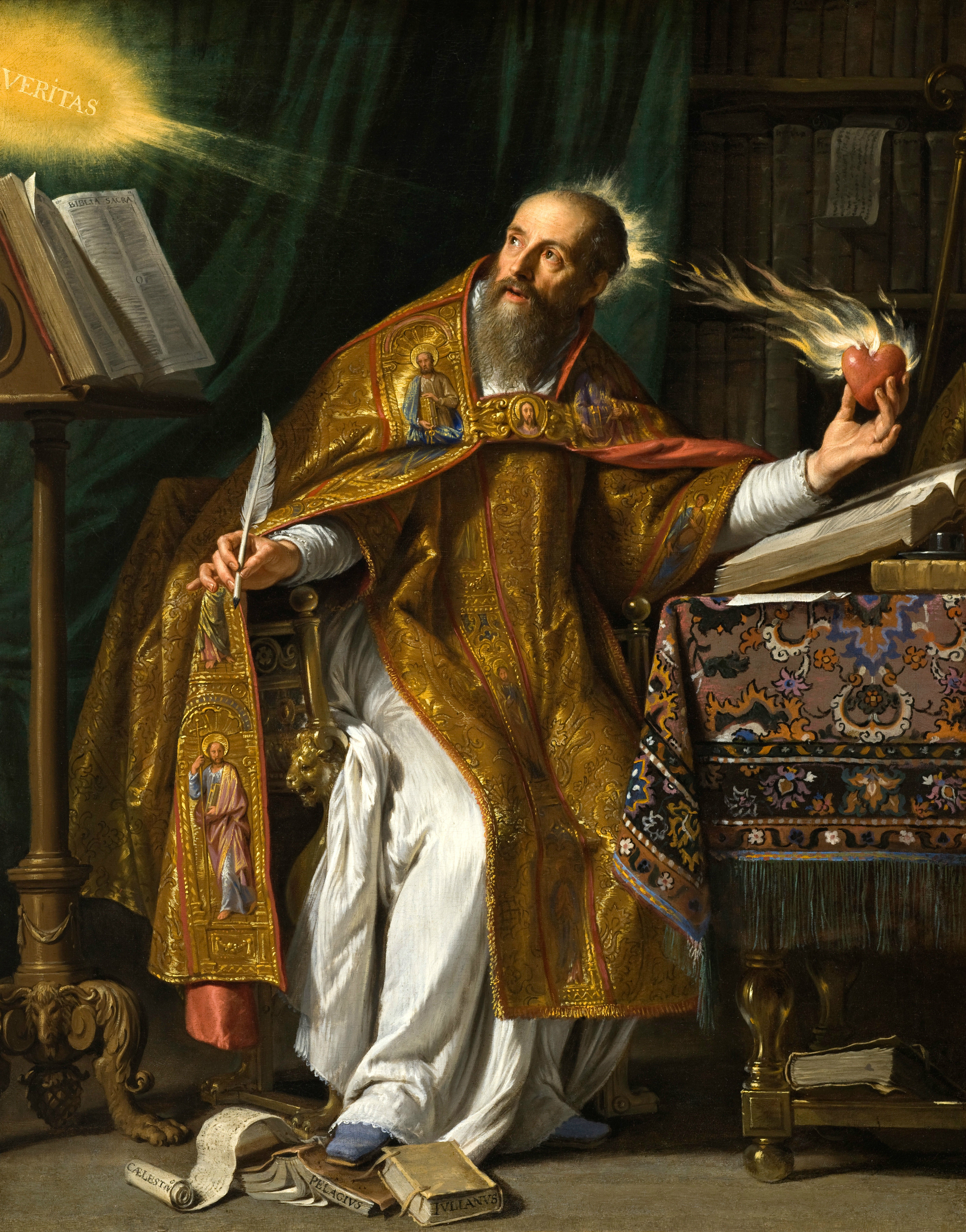
Saint Augustine of Hippo, painting from ca.1650

- Augustine of Hippo (354–430), also known as Saint Augustine, Bishop of Hippo Regius (present-day Annaba)
- Ahmad al-Buni, (died 1225), born in Bône (now Annaba), well-known Sufi and writer on the esoteric value of letters and topics relating to mathematics, sihr (sorcery) and spirituality.
- Hamdi Benani (1943–2020), born in Annaba, Algerian singer and musician
- Raoul Borra (1896-1988), born in Bône, French politician
- Mohamed Boudiaf (1919–1992), Algerian president, assassinated in Annaba
- Robert Cohen (1930–2022), born in Bône, French boxer
- Eustache Cuicci (1908-1980), French politician
- Edwige Fenech (born 1948), born in Bône, Italian actress
- Professor Alain Ferry (born 1939), writer, awarded the 2009 Prix Médicis
- Salim Halali (1920–2005), born in Annaba, Algerian singer
- Juba I of Numidia (ca. 85–46 BC), Amazigh king of Numidia
- Juba II (c. 48 BC – AD 23), son of Juba I, Amazigh king of Numidia and Mauretania, spouse of Cleopatra Selene II
- Marshal Alphonse Juin (1888–1967), born in Bône, French pied-noir general during World Wars I & II
- Michèle Victory (born 1958), French politician

== Gallery ==
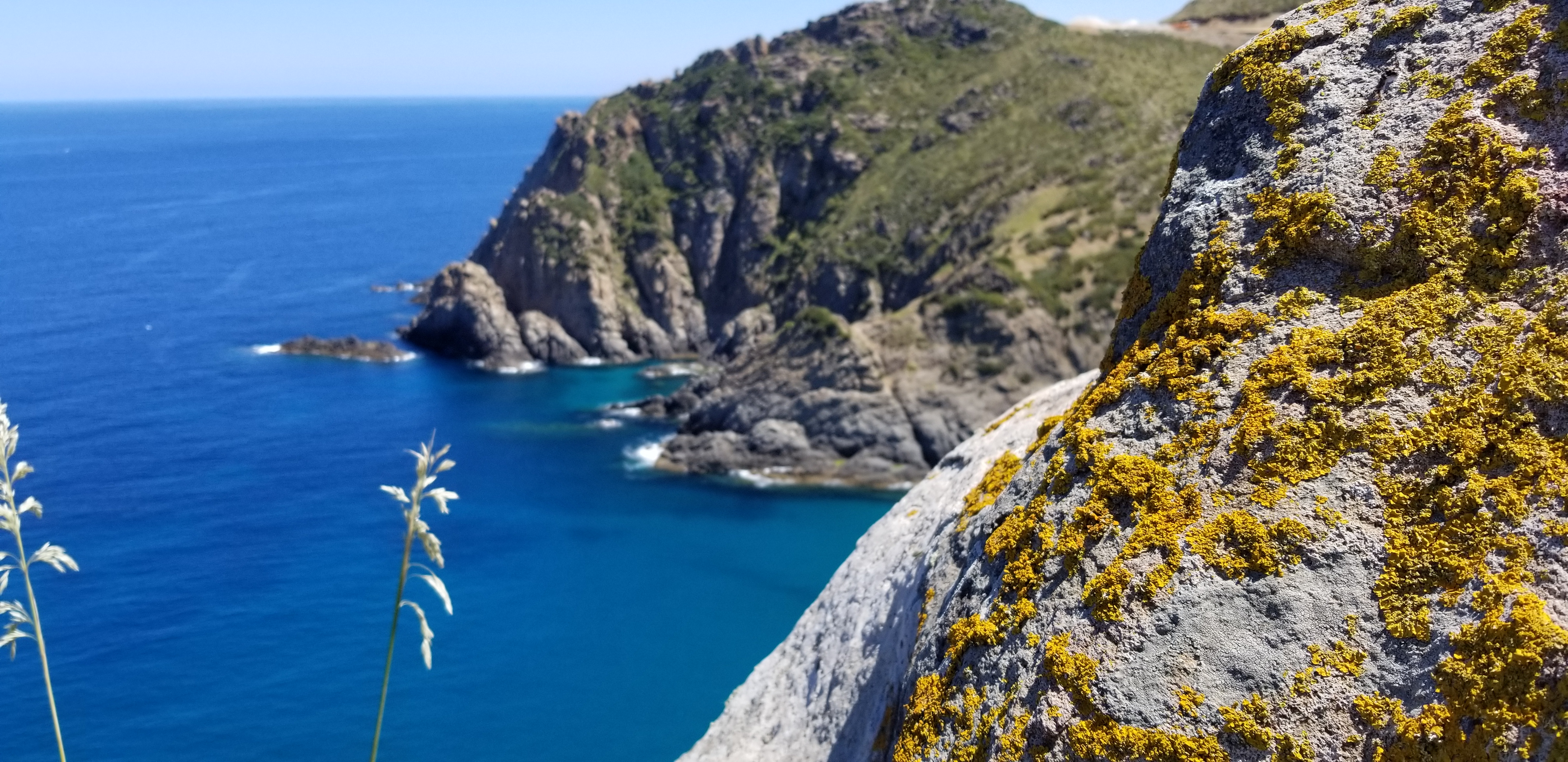

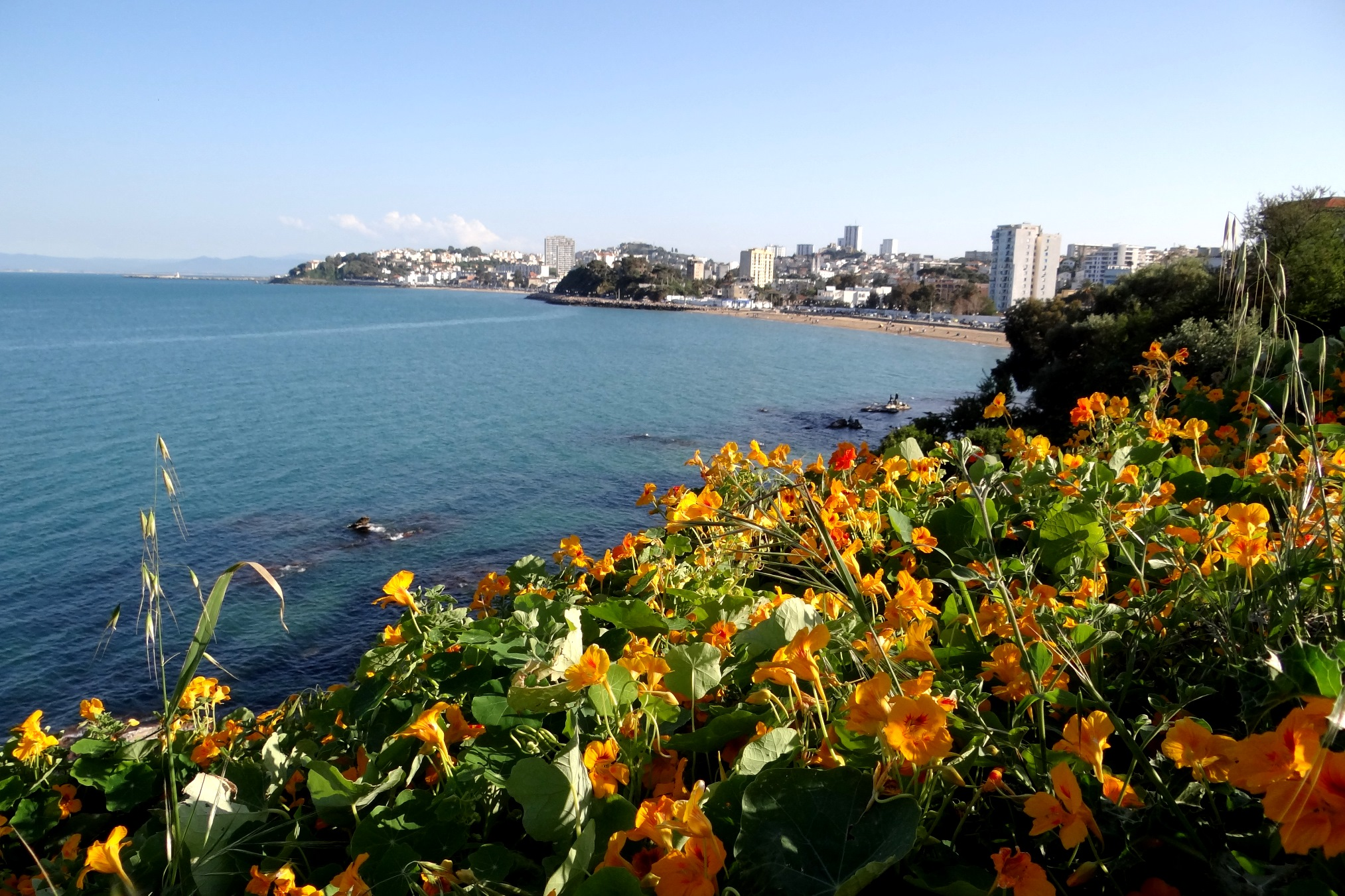

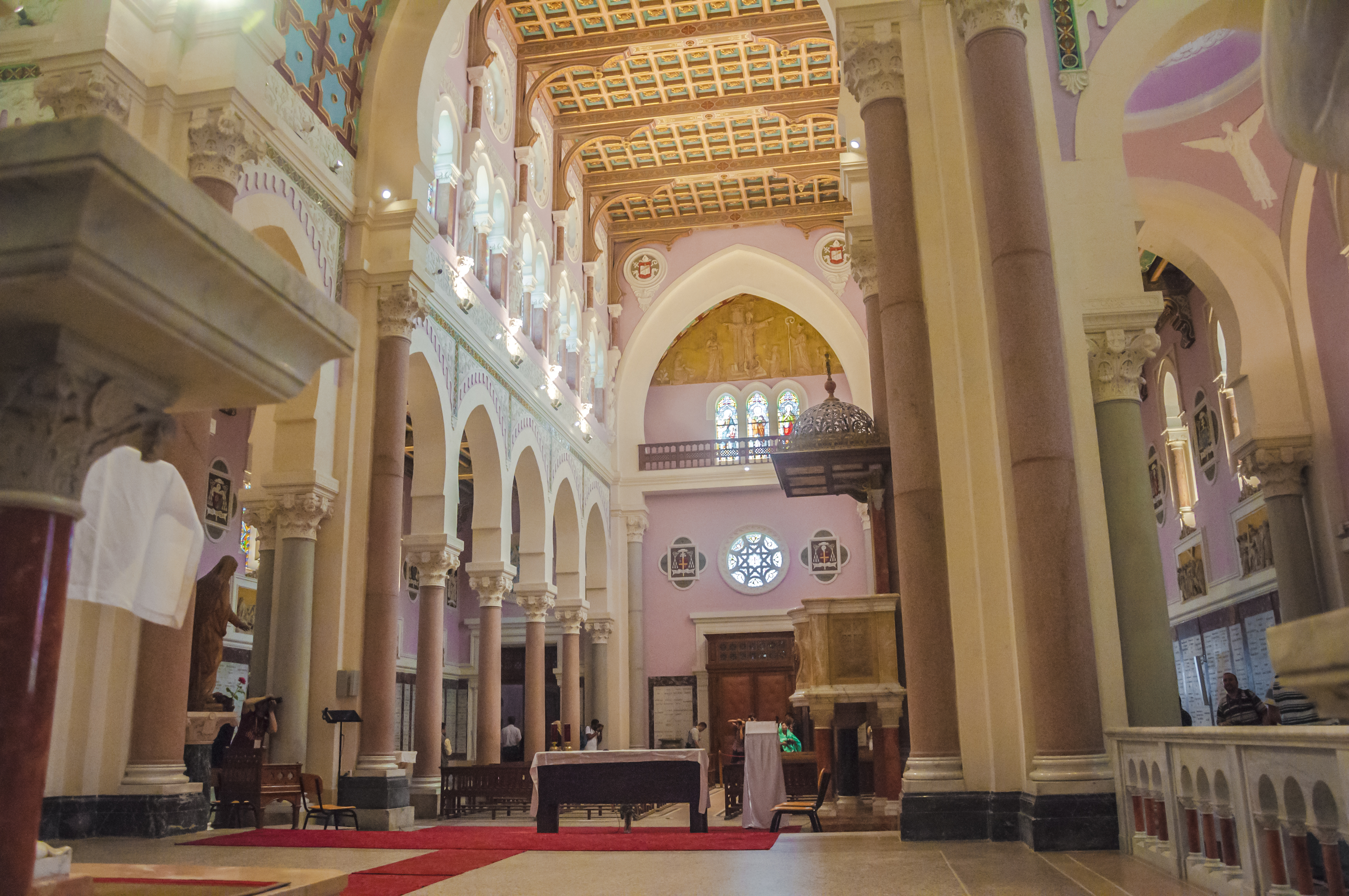

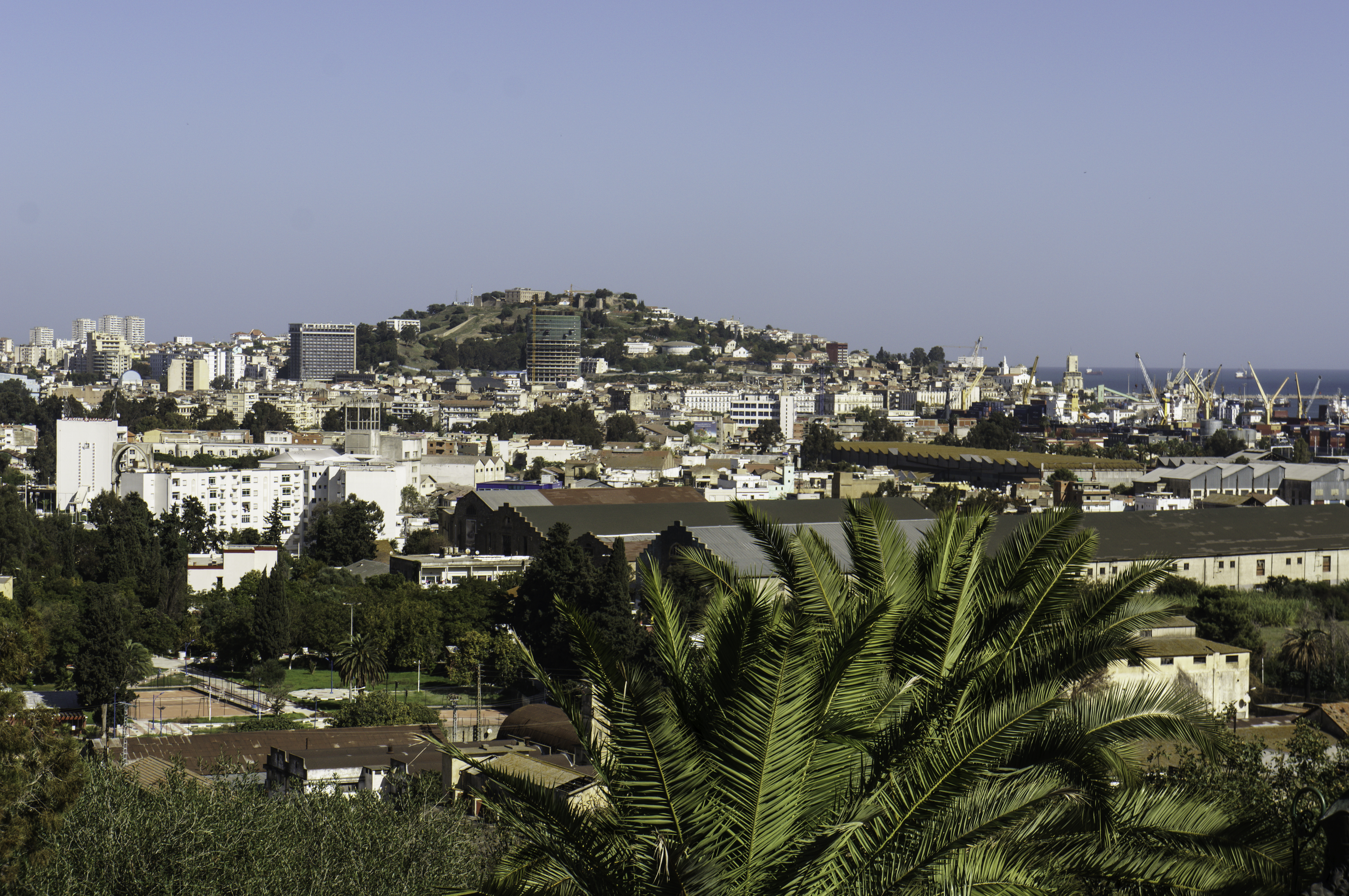

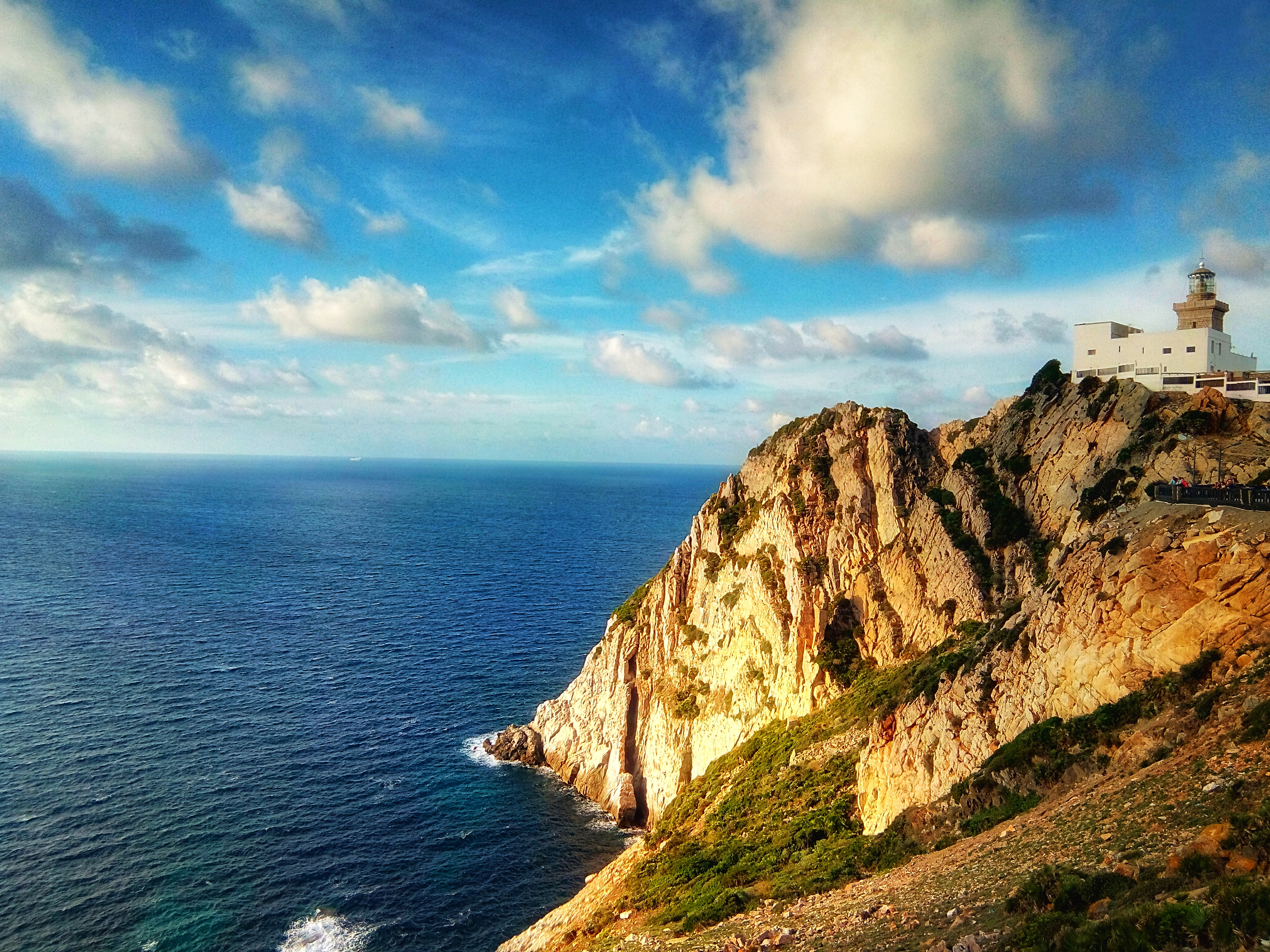

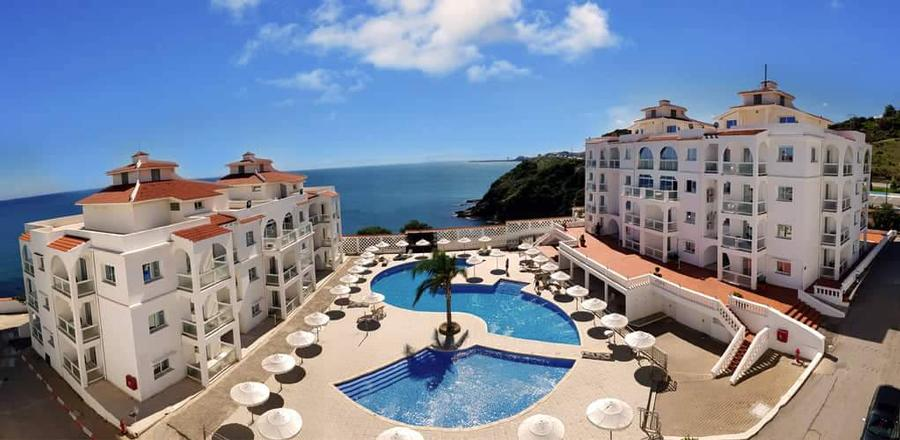

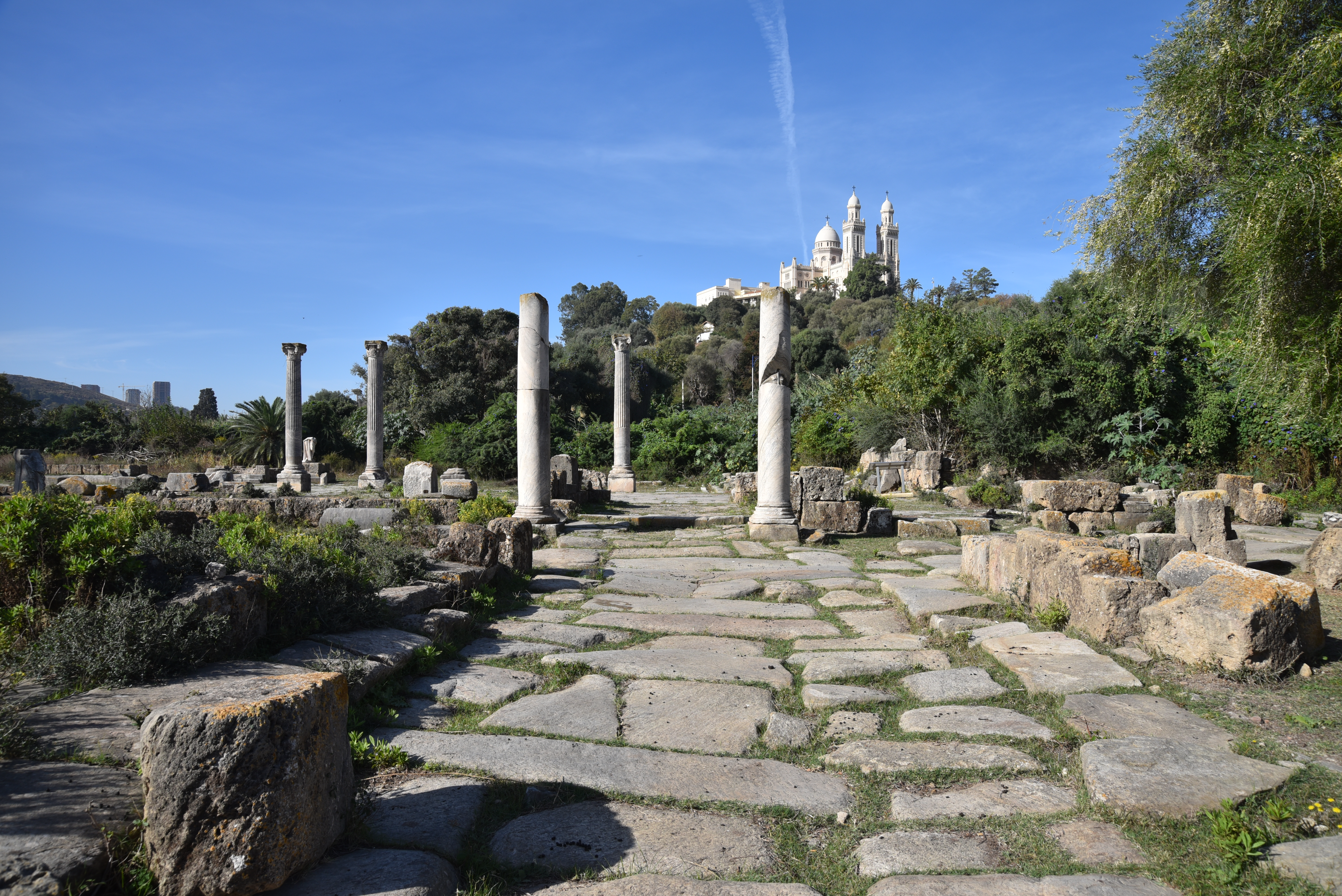

== In the arts ==
- An engraving of a painting by J Salmon, Town and Harbour of Bona, Africa. was published in Fisher's Drawing Room Scrap Book, 1837 along with a poetical illustration by Letitia Elizabeth Landon entitled Bona, The Pirate's Song.

== See also ==
- European enclaves in North Africa before 1830
- Edough Massif

== Sources ==
- Baynes, T. S., ed. (1878), "Bône" , Encyclopædia Britannica, vol. 4 (9th ed.), New York: Charles Scribner's Sons, pp. 31–32
- Chisholm, Hugh, ed. (1911), "Bona" , Encyclopædia Britannica, vol. 4 (11th ed.), Cambridge University Press, pp. 190–191
- Iron and Steel Institute (1880), "Africa", The Journal of the Iron and Steel Institute, The Institute
- Levainville, J. (15 March 1924), "Ressources minérales de l'Afrique du Nord", Annales de Géographie (in French), 33e Année (182): 151–166, doi:10.3406/geo.1924.9698, JSTOR 23439890
- Passaqui, Jean-Philippe (2013), "Quand l'innovation engendre l'incertitude : réception et diffusion du procédé Martin", Marteau Pilon (in French), archived from the original on 22 May 2024
- Prochaska, David (2002), Making Algeria French: Colonialism in Bône, 1870–1920, Cambridge University Press, ISBN 978-0-521-53128-3, archived from the original on 22 May 2024
