= Jacques de Nervo =

French industrialist

- Sketch of de Nervo from L'Entreprise 1 August 1953
- Born: 31 August 1897; Margency, Val-d'Oise, France
- Died: 27 June 1990 (aged 92); Saint-Rémy-de-Provence, Bouches-du-Rhône, France
- Occupation: Industrialist
- Known for: Creation of French steel making group Usinor
- Spouse: Jacqueline Ducourthial de Lassuchette (m. 1920)

Jacques de Nervo (31 August 1897 – 27 June 1990) was a French industrialist.

He was born into a family of railway pioneers and steelmakers. After World War I (1914–18) he joined one of the family companies as a factory worker, and quickly became an executive. He was involved in various major steel enterprises before, during and after World War II (1939–45). He was responsible for the creation of Usinor, which became the largest French steel making group.

== Family and early life ==
Jacques de Nervo was born on 31 August 1897, son of Baron Léon de Nervo and Germaine Davillier (1875–1949). He was the great grandson of Léon Talabot, one of the founders of the French railway industry. His grandfather, Baron Robert de Nervo, married Talabot's daughter and was the first of the Nervo family to enter business. He became vice-president of the Chemins de fer de Paris à Lyon et à la Méditerranée (PLM) in 1896. Robert de Nervo died on 24 August 1909.

Jacques' father Léon trained as an engineer at the École centrale, specializing in mining and metallurgy. Léon was involved in various businesses and became chief executive officer of Compagnie de Mokta-El Hadid, an Algeria iron mining company.

Jacques de Nervo studied at the Lycée Louis-le-Grand and at Bossuet. He passed his baccalauréats during World War I and in 1916 joined the army as a private soldier. On his 21st birthday he was at the front with a battery of 75mm guns. He had just been named second lieutenant and given command of the battery to replace the former commander, who had been killed. He was made a knight of the Legion of Honour, and was then appointed an officer in the Ministry of Labour. When he left the army in 1919 he was an officer with a Croix de Guerre and three citations.

== Career ==
Nervo began his career in 1919 by joining the Société du Saut-du-Tarn, a steelworks. The Société du Saut-du-Tarn had been created by Léon and Paulin Talabot, who also founded the Société Mokta El Hadid in Algeria, the Mines de charbon de la Grand-Combe and the Hauts Fourneaux de Denain-Anzin. To gain a thorough understanding of the business he worked at all the different jobs in the Saut-du-Tarn factory. He became general secretary of the company in 1921, a director, then president and chief executive officer.

Throughout his career Jacques de Nervo was involved in the steel industry. The Centre des jeunes patrons was created due to the concerns of private business owners after the Popular Front won the 1936 elections. The honorary president was de Nervo, vice-president of the Société du Saut-du-Tarn and a member of the board of the Union des industries et métiers de la métallurgie (UIMM). He was chairman of the accident prevention committee of the UIMM.

De Nervo entered Denain-Anzin as a director. When Henri de Nanteuil died accidentally in 1941 de Nervo took over as president of Denain Anzin. He made René Damien his second in command as director general. De Nervo and Damien were among the founders in 1947 of Usinor (Union Sidérurgique du Nord de la France), in which Denain Anzin merged with the Forges et Aciéries du Nord et de l'Est. This was the first of a series of mergers in the French steel industry, followed by the creation of Sidélor, Lorraine-Escaut and Sollac. De Nervo arranged various other mergers. In 1957 Usinor was the largest French steelmaker, with production of 2,160,000 tons.

De Nervo was vice-president of the Société des mines et fonderies de Pontgibaud in 1953. He was also a vice president of the Ateliers et Chantiers de France and an administrator of Usinor. He was an administrator of Tubes de Valenciennes, Commentry-Fourchambault et Decazeville and Omnium Industriel et Commercial.

== Personal life ==
On 14 April 1920 Nervo married Jacqueline Ducourthial de Lassuchette (1901–1997) in Paris. He did not drink alcohol or smoke, and was always involved in sports. In 1922 he was a diving champion. He competed in the 1924 Olympics on a 6-meter sailboat, and was a polo player and was head of the French Polo Federation. Later he became a dedicated golf player.

== Death ==
Jacques de Nervo died on 27 June 1990 at the age of 92.

== Sources ==
- Arbanère, Fabien, "Jacques de Nervo", geneanet (in French)
- Bot, Florent Le (April–June 2012), "La naissance du Centre des jeunes patrons (1938-1944): Entre réaction et relève", Vingtième Siècle. Revue d'histoire (114, Patrons et patronat en France au 20 e siècle), Sciences Po University Press, JSTOR 23326298
- Garric, Alain, "Jacques DE NERVO", geneanet (in French)
- "Jacques de Nervo" (PDF), L'Entreprise (in French), 9, 1 August 1953
- "Jacques de Nervo : l'homme des concentrations" (PDF), L'Entreprise (in French) (128), 15 February 1958
- "Nervo de, Jacques", Patrons de France (in French), SIPPAF
- Palmas, Jean Pierre de, "Robert de Nervo", Geneanet (in French)
- "Pontgibaud (Mines et Fonderies de)", SYMOGIH.ORG (in French)
