= Robert de Nervo =

French industrialist (1842-1909)

- Born: 3 September 1842; Paris, France
- Died: 24 August 1909 (aged 66); Dammarie-lès-Lys, Paris, France
- Occupation: Industrialist

Baron Robert de Nervo (3 September 1842 – 24 August 1909) was a French industrialist involved in mining, steelmaking and railways.

== Early years ==
Robert de Nervo was born on 3 September 1842 in Paris, France. His parents were Gonsalve Jean Baptiste Rosario, baron de Nervo (1804–97), and Adélaïde Marie Suzanne Brugière de Barante (1813–86). Robert de Nervo became an administrator of the Chemins de fer de Paris à Lyon et à la Méditerranée (PLM) railway network. On 31 October 1867 he married Lucie-Agathe Talabot (1844–73). She was the daughter of Léon Talabot and niece of Paulin Talabot, pioneers of the French railway industry and founders of the Nîmes-Beaucaire railway and the PLM network. Robert and Lucie-Agathe's children were Prosper de Nervo (1868–1932) and Léon de Nervo (1873–1973).

During the Paris Commune of 1871 Robert de Nervo left the city with the reserves of the PLM hidden under his cloak, 6.5 million gold francs, which he deposited with the Bank of France in Clermont-Ferrand. A few years after his first wife died, on 23 June 1879 he married Claire Sanson de Sansal (1853–1941). Their children were Suzanne de Nervo (1880–1944) and Jean de Nervo (1881–1934).

== Senior executive ==
Robert de Nervo became vice-president of the PLM in 1896. That year he also became chairman of the Denain-Anzin iron works, which he began to modernise. He renovated the blast furnaces, and acquired the Azincourt Mining Company to ensure a supply of affordable coal. By the early 1900s Denain-Anzin had one of the largest and most efficient Thomas steel mills in the country.

Robert de Wendel, president of the Comité des Forges de France (CFF) and vice-president of the Union des industries et métiers de la métallurgie (UIMM), died in 1903 and Rovert de Nervo became vice-president of both the CFF and the UIMM. In January 1904, at his initiative, the company presidents Edmond Duval, Albert Jouet-Pastré and Léon Lévy asked for a small committee to outline an agreement for close cooperation between the CFF, UIMM and the associations of railway equipment manufacturers, ship builders and war material manufacturers. The arrangement was completed in February 1904 with Robert Pinot as secretary general.

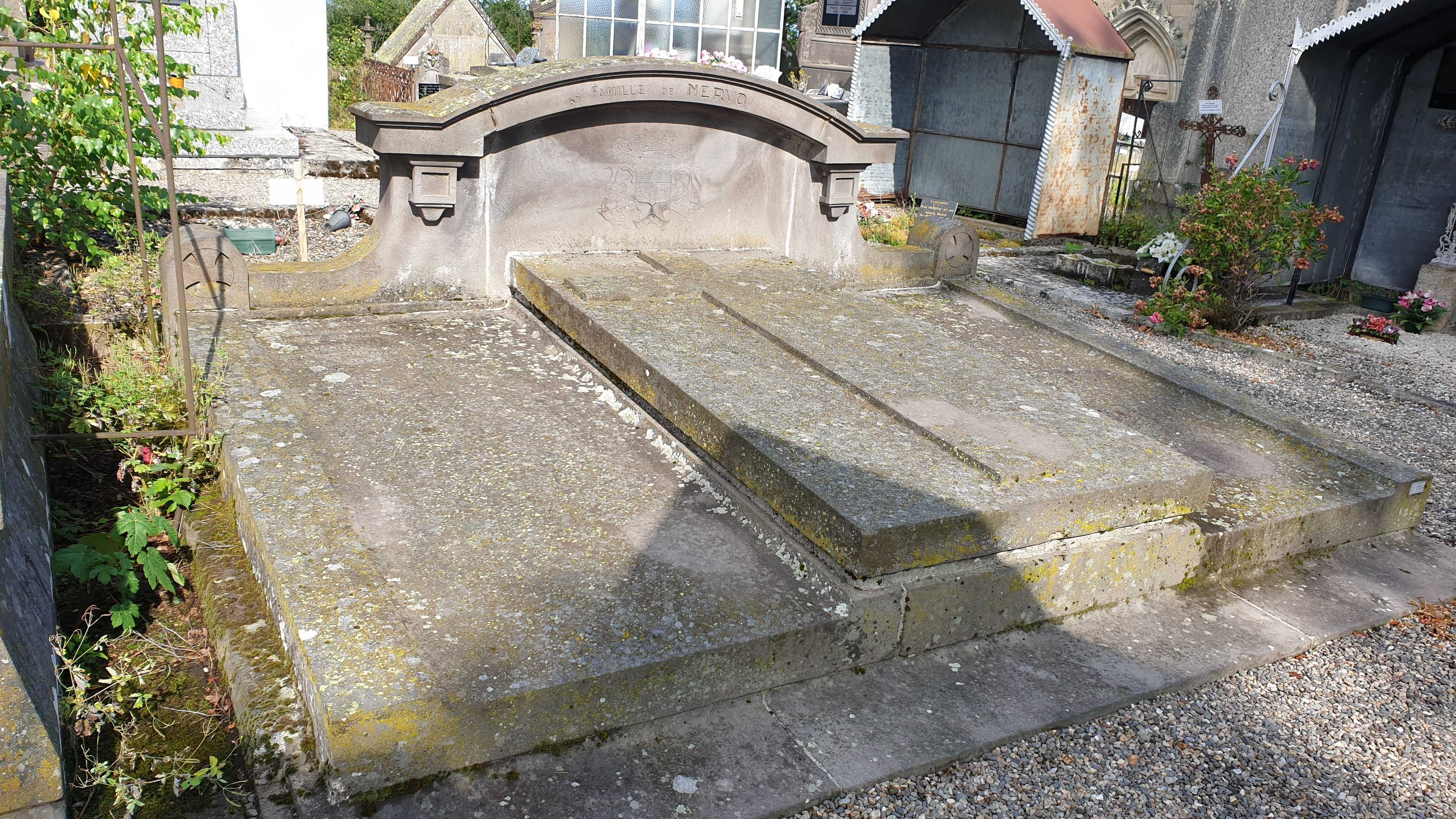
The grave of Robert de Nervo

Robert de Nervo was also councilor-general of Olliergues, Puy-de-Dôme.

Robert de Nervo died on 24 August 1909 in Dammarie-lès-Lys and is buried in the Olliergues cemetery. His son, Léon de Nervo, trained as an engineer at the Ecole centrale, specializing in mining and metallurgy. Léon's son Jacques de Nervo (1897–1990) was also an industrialist.

== Corporate positions ==
- President, Ateliers et Chantiers de la Loire
- President, Société des hauts fourneaux et des forges de Denain et d'Anzin
- President, Société des mines et fonderies de Pontgibaud
- President, Société Mokta El Hadid
- Vice-president, Chemins de fer de Paris à Lyon et à la Méditerranée (PLM)
- Vice-president, Compagnie des phosphates de Gafsa
- Administrator, Docks de Marseille
- Administrator, Société des Hauts-Fourneaux, forges et aciéries du Saut-du-Tarn

== Publications ==
Published work by Robert de Nervo include:

- Brugière de Barante, Amable Guillaume Prosper (1866), De la décentralisation en 1829 et en 1833, Preface "Quelques mots sur le projet de Nancy" by Robert de Nervo
- Baron de Nervo (1869), La monarchie espagnole: ses origines, sa fondation, Paris: Michel-Lévy frères, p. 59
- Baron de Nervo (1879), Calchas II: sa dynastie, son empire, Paris: C. Lévy, p. 283
- Baron de Nervo (1881), Les mémoires de mon coupé, Paris: Calmann Lévy, p. 324
- Baron de Nervo (1883), Les confidences d'une hirondelle: histoire russe, Paris: Calmann Lévy, p. 291

== Sources ==
- Barbier, Frédéric; Daviet, Jean-Pierre (1989), Le patronat du Nord sous le Second Empire: une approche prosopographique, Librairie Droz, ISBN 978-2-600-03408-1
- Fraboulet, Danièle (2007), Quand les patrons s'organisent: Stratégies et pratiques de l'UIMM 1901-1950 (in French), Presses Univ. Septentrion, ISBN 978-2-85939-994-8
- "Jacques de Nervo" (PDF), L'Entreprise (in French), 9, 1 August 1953
- Palmas, Jean Pierre de, "Robert de Nervo", Geneanet (in French)
- Robert de Nervo, BnF: Bibliotheque nationale de France
- Smith, Michael Stephen (2006), The Emergence of Modern Business Enterprise in France, 1800-1930, Harvard University Press, ISBN 978-0-674-01939-3
