= Talabot =

Talabot is a surname. Notable people with the surname include:

- John Talabot (born 1982), Spanish DJ
- Léon Talabot (1796–1863), French engineer, iron master and politician
- Paulin Talabot (1799–1885), French railway and canal engineer
