= Denain-Anzin =

French steel manufacturer, 1849–1948

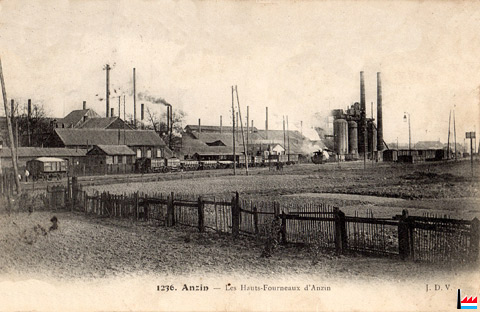
- Anzin blast furnaces
- Company type: Manufacturer
- Industry: Steel
- Founded: 1849
- Founder: Léon Talabot
- Defunct: July 1, 1948
- Fate: Merged with Nord-Est to form Usinor
- Headquarters: France

Denain-Anzin (Société des hauts-fourneaux, forges et aciéries de Denain et d'Anzin) was a steel manufacturer in Denain and Anzin in the Nord department of France. The company was created through the merger of two smaller forges to produce rails for the Nord railway company. After World War II it was merged with other companies in 1948 to form Usinor.

== Origins ==
The Société Serret, Lelièvre et Cie was constituted in 1834 to build and run the Forges de Denain. The partners were Georges Serret, Isidore Charpentier-Odolant and Charles Lelièvre. Pierre François Dumont also participated. Serret and Dumont were also partners in the Forges de Raismes (Renaux, Dumant et Cie). The factory in Denain was located beside the Escaut river, which had been canalized between Valenciennes and Cambrai since 1775. The docks on the river were owned by the Compagnie des Mines d'Anzin, a coal mining operation, apart from one quay used by the steel factory. The Mines d'Anzin operated three coal mines 100 metres (330 ft) below the factory. The first coke-fired blast furnaces of the Forges de Denain began operations in 1836.

location of Denain in France

In 1834 Benoît Vasseur, using external capital, asked for permission to build an iron factory at Anzin similar to that at Denain. Due to lack of money, Vasseur was unable to build a blast furnace and built only a forge and puddling furnaces. In 1842 he sold the business, the Forges et Laminoirs d'Anzin for 1,100,000 francs to the Société de Commerce de Bruxelles, a subsidiary of the Société Générale de Belgique. This was a major bank associated with the Rothschilds that worked with Léon Talabot in the Nord. Both the Denain and Anzin companies had little difficulty training their workers, since there was a long history of mining and industry in the region.

Construction of the Chemins de Fer du Nord drove the integration of small forges into rolling mills to supply rails. The Compagnie du chemin de fer du Nord was unable to import Belgian rails in 1846. To obtain a better supply, in 1849 the Talabots took control of the Denain and Anzin forges and merged them. Talabot combined the Forges et Laminoirs d'Anzin with the Serret, Lelièvre, Dumont et Cie company of Denain to form the Société des hauts-fourneaux et des forges de Denain et Anzin, the largest metallurgical company in the Nord Department.

== Pre-World War I ==
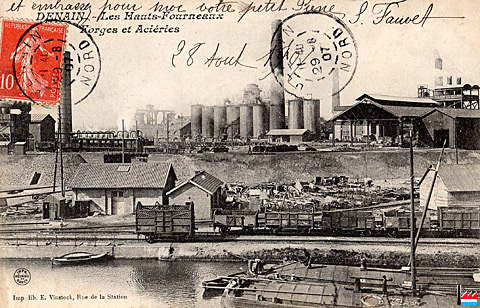
Denain forges, canal in foreground

Talabot managed Denain-Anzin after the merger. Georges Serret, who died in 1854, retained an important stake in the company. His second daughter married Hippolyte Waternau, an advocate, who became an administrator of the company. In 1849 Denain-Anzin had capital of 10 million francs. At the time of the merger there was no blast furnace at Anzin, while the Denain factory had three. By 1854 Denain-Anzin had five blast furnaces, of which two were in Anzin.

A difficult period for the manufacturers of the north of France began in 1860, which they blamed entirely on the free-trade Cobden–Chevalier Treaty signed at the start of the year. In fact the problem was largely caused by depletion of local iron ore, which was causing the cost of production to rise fast. The imports from Britain and Belgium were not enough to be a significant threat to the iron industry, and imports of cheap coal and coke would have helped. In 1860 the Inspector-General of Mines, Charles Combes, wrote to the Minister of Commerce that the real goal of the Comite des Forges, of which Leon Talabot of Denain-Anzin was president, was to maintain the price of iron by using any arguments of threats they thought would work.

In 1863 Hippolyte Waternau became director. Waternau was president of the Conférence Saint-Vincent-de-Paul. He introduced sisters of that charity to run several services for Denain-Anzin. Unlike the nearby coal mines, the demand for steel fluctuated widely, and until 1872 the company's finances were shaky. In the crisis of 1866–68 the company came close to bankruptcy, and was forced to lay off workers at both plants. In 1870 the company became a Société Anonyme. During the Franco-Prussian War of 1870 the company was unable to pay its workers in cash, but instead paid in vouchers on the company's food store.

Paulin Talabot became president in 1872. In 1878 the company was part of a syndicate that obtain the 953 hectares (2,350 acres) Godbrange concession, and in 1890 obtained part of the neighboring Tiercelet concession. In 1879 Senelle-Maubeuge and Denain-Anzin bought the Côte-Rouge mining properties. In 1886 Senelle-Maubeuge and Denain-Anzin acquired the Jarny concession. In 1896 Robert de Nervo (Note: Baron Robert de Nervo (1842–1909) had married Léon Talabot's daughter Lucie-Agathe (1844–73) on 31 October 1867.) became chairman of the Denain-Anzin iron works, which he began to modernise. The Nervo family would make Denain-Anzin the fifth-largest steel producer in France by 1913. In 1902 Denain-Anzin started up a new steelworks using the Thomas process, the Aciérie Jordan, the largest in the Nord. This was one of the largest and most efficient Thomas steel mills in the country.

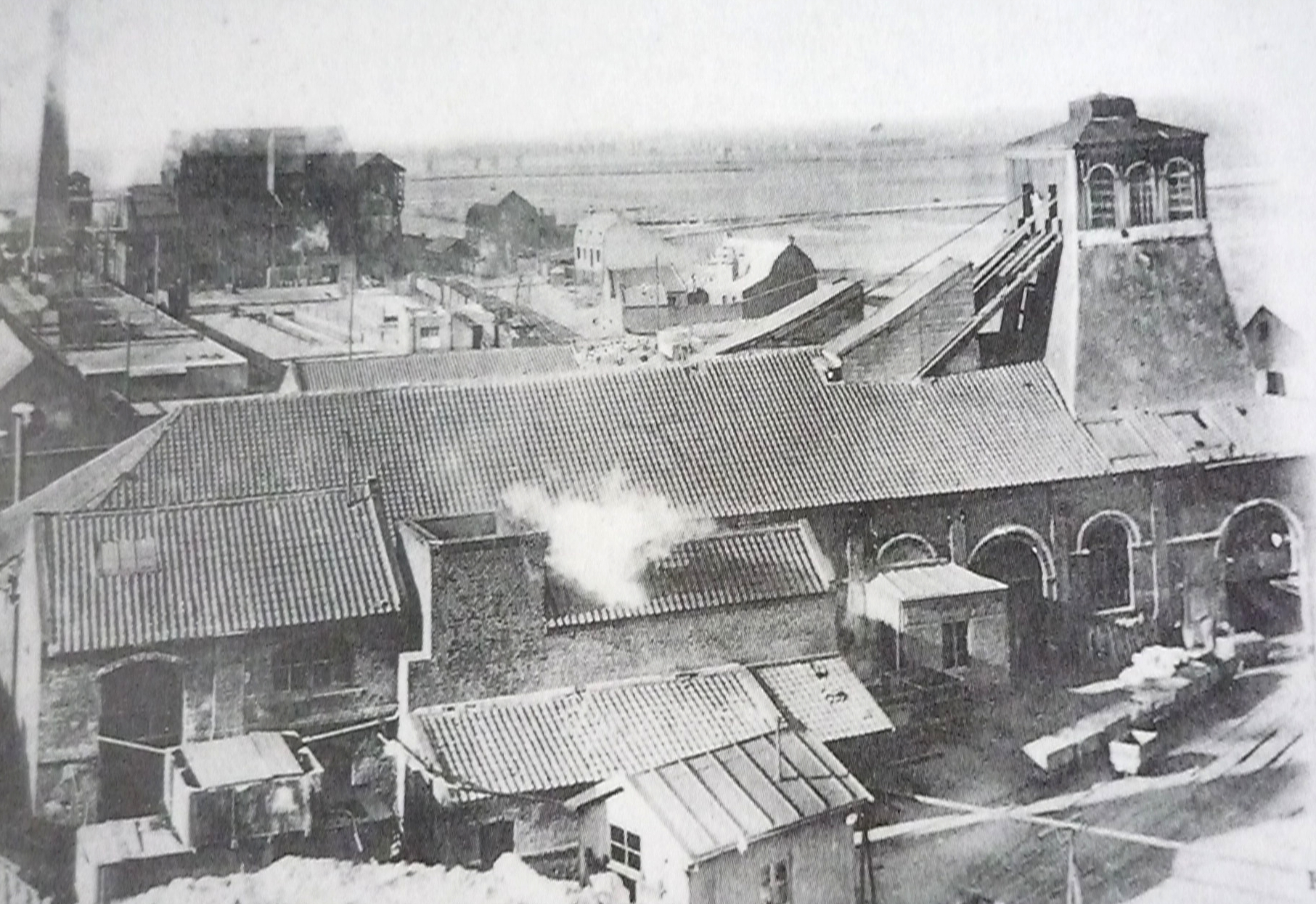
Pit 1 of the Compagnie des mines d'Azincourt c. 1900

The company absorbed the Compagnie des Charbonnages d'Azincourt on 12 July 1906 to ensure a supply of affordable coal. Denain-Anzin delayed electrification until about 1913, since the change required conversion of all its steam-based power plants. In the fifteen years before World War I (1914–18) the company invested 75 million francs. In 1913 Denain-Anzin produced 390,000 tons of steel, or 7.68% of total French steel production. The company produced only 17,000 tons of iron due to low demand and low profitability. In 1913 the company was the 17th largest publicly held manufacturing enterprise in France, and 8th largest primary metals company with assets of 64.1 million francs. The largest steel company, Marine et Homecourt, had assets of 120.7 million francs.

== World War I ==
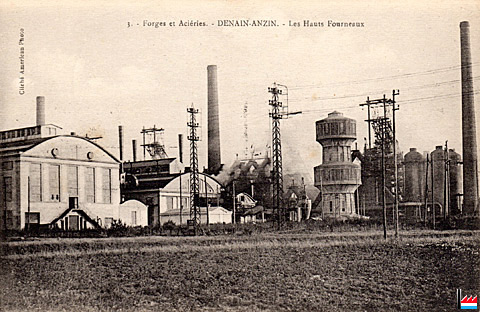
Denain-Anzin blast furnaces

In 1917 the Société Mokta El Hadid and the Société des Hauts Fourneaux de Rouen agreed to form a joint venture to exploit the Boukhadra deposits in Algeria, which was supported by the minister Albert Thomas. However, the administration of Algerian governor Charles Lutaud submitted an alternative proposal to the government that required the company to build blast furnaces in Bône and to pay higher royalties to Algeria. The agreement and specifications for this project were signed early in 1918, with 85% of the capital supplied by Mokta and Hauts Fourneaux de Rouen, and 15% by Denain-Anzin and a consortium of Algerian banks. Two blast furnaces would be built with combined annual capacity of 80,000 tons. However, after Charles Jonnart returned to Algeria as governor the project was delayed and eventually cancelled.

== Later history ==
The war damages act of 1919 took little account of the age of the facilities that had been destroyed. For Nord-Est, which had 80% new plant in 1914, it was a disaster. For Denain-Anzin, it was a boon, since obsolete plant could be replaced. The Denain factory was built in 1920 to produce rather more than 500,000 tons of steel per year, and would achieve a record of 2,419,631 tons in 1974. The company became a public limited liability company on 19 November 1920. Denain-Anzin built a railway line to Azincourt to carry coke from the mines there to the factory. Between 1928 and 1946 Denain-Anzin invested 75 million in its two factories.

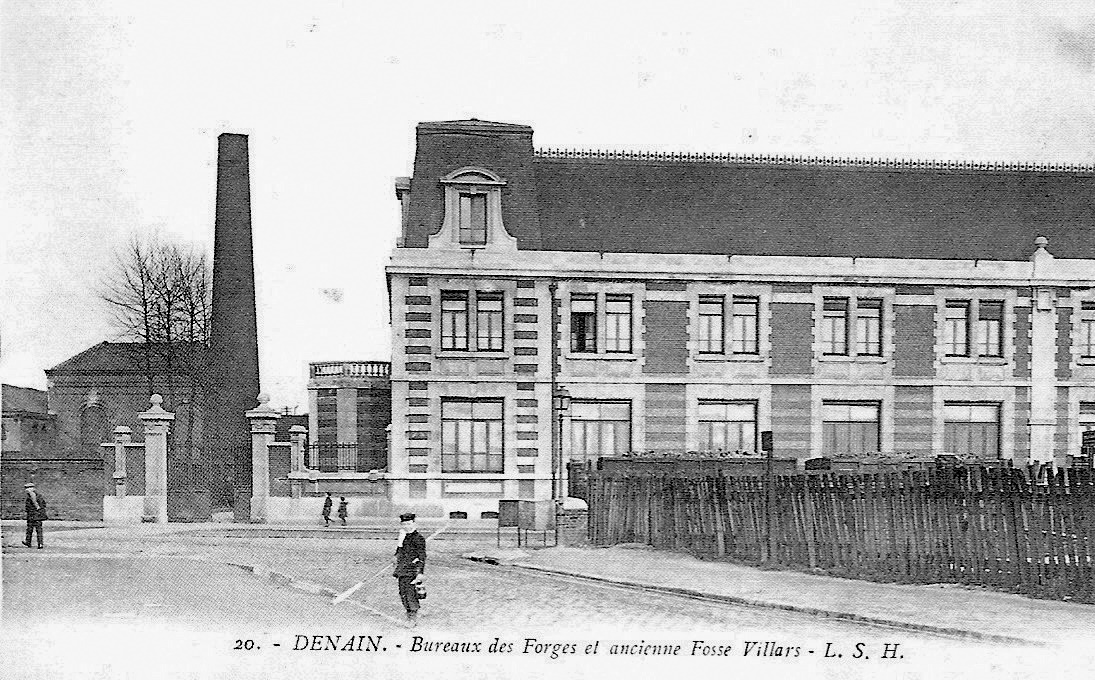
Denain: Bureaux des Forges et ancienne Fosse Villars

In the 1930s the company belonged to a cartel, the Comptoir Sidérurgique de France, which set quotas for each company's production of semi finished steel, structural shapes, merchant bars, thick plates and sheets. However, discipline was weak and the members often exceeded their quotas. Well before the 1948 merger with Nord-Est, the products manufactured by Denain-Anzin had slowly diverged from those by the Valenciennes division of Nord-Est, allowing each firm to scale up production in their speciality with reduced competition. For example, the two companies produced the same quantities of girders in 1930, but by 1936 Nord-Est produced six times as much as Denain-Anzin. After the June 1940 defeat of France during World War II (1939–45), a law of 16 August 1940 created Sidenor, the Groupement des Industries Side-rugiques du Nord-Pas-de-Calais. Denain-Anzin and Nord-Est both came under the control of Sidenor, producing 80% of its steel.

Usinor (Union Sidérurgique du Nord) was created on 1 July 1948 by a merger of Denain-Anzin with Nord-Est (Forges et Aciéries du Nord et de l'Est). In 1957 the company became "Denain-Anzin", and it absorbed the Société anonyme des tubes de Valenciennes et de Denain, the Compagnie des terres réfractaires françaises, the Société des argiles de la Brie, the Société Les réfractaires de Longueville and the Société des produits minéraux industriels. In 1965 it merged with the Société des forges et aciéries du Nord et de l'Est to form Denain-Anzin Nord-Est.

== Sources ==
- Barbezat, Daniel (Winter 1996), "The "Comptoir Sidérurgique de France", 1930–1939", The Business History Review, 70 (4), The President and Fellows of Harvard College: 517–540, doi:10.2307/3117314, JSTOR 3117314, S2CID 154863123
- Barbier, Frédéric; Daviet, Jean-Pierre (1989), Le patronat du Nord sous le Second Empire: une approche prosopographique, Librairie Droz, ISBN 978-2-600-03408-1
- Denain-Anzin (in French), BnF: Bibliotheque nationale de France
- Dunham, Arthur Louis (February 1927), "The Influence of the Anglo-French Treaty of Commerce of 1860 on the Development of the Iron Industry in France", The Quarterly Journal of Economics, 41 (2), Oxford University Press: 317–337, doi:10.2307/1883504, JSTOR 1883504
- Dunham, Arthur L. (November 1943), "Industrial Life and Labor in France 1815-1848", The Journal of Economic History, 3 (2), Cambridge University Press on behalf of the Economic History Association: 117–151, doi:10.1017/S0022050700083522, JSTOR 2113493, S2CID 154716538
- Hardy-Hémery, Odette (2002), Trith-Saint-Léger: du premier âge industriel à nos jours (in French), Presses Univ. Septentrion, ISBN 978-2-85939-768-5
- Hardy-Hemery, Odette (October–December 1983), "Une nébuleuse en expansion aux XIXe et XXe siècles: l'espace de l'usine sidérurgique de Denain", Le Mouvement Social (in French), 125 (125), Editions l'Atelier on behalf of Association Le Mouvement Social: 57–78, doi:10.2307/3777682, JSTOR 3777682
- "Hauts Fourneaux et des Forges et Aciéries de Denain - Anzin", L'Histoire industrielle du Luxembourg (in French), industrie.lu
- Meynier, Gilbert (1981), L'Algérie révélée: la guerre de 1914–1918 et le premier quart du XXe siècle (in French), Librairie Droz, ISBN 978-2-600-04098-3
- Palmas, Jean Pierre de, "Robert de Nervo", Geneanet (in French)
- Smith, Michael S. (Spring 1998), "Putting France in the Chandlerian Framework: France's 100 Largest Industrial Firms in 1913", The Business History Review, 72 (1), The President and Fellows of Harvard College: 46–85, doi:10.2307/3116595, JSTOR 3116595, S2CID 154027899
- Smith, Michael Stephen (2006), The Emergence of Modern Business Enterprise in France, 1800–1930, Harvard University Press, ISBN 978-0-674-01939-3
