= Comité des forges =

French political organization of the iron and steel industry

Comité des forges de France
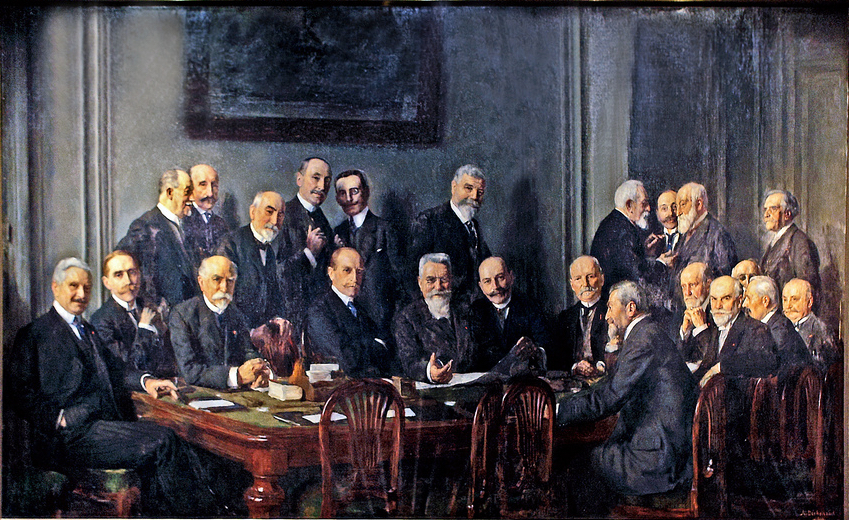
- Le comité des forges (1914) by Adolphe Déchenaud
- Formation: 1864
- Founder: Eugène Schneider
- Dissolved: 1940
- Legal status: Defunct

The Comité des forges (French pronunciation: [kɔmite de fɔʁʒ], Foundry Committee) was an organization of leaders of the French iron and steel industry from 1864 to 1940, when it was dissolved by the Vichy government. It typically took a protectionist attitude on trade issues, and was opposed to social legislation that would increase costs. At times it was influential, particularly during World War I (1914–18), and the Left often viewed it with justified suspicion. However the Comité des forges always suffered from divisions among its members, and the government often ignored its advice.

== Foundation ==
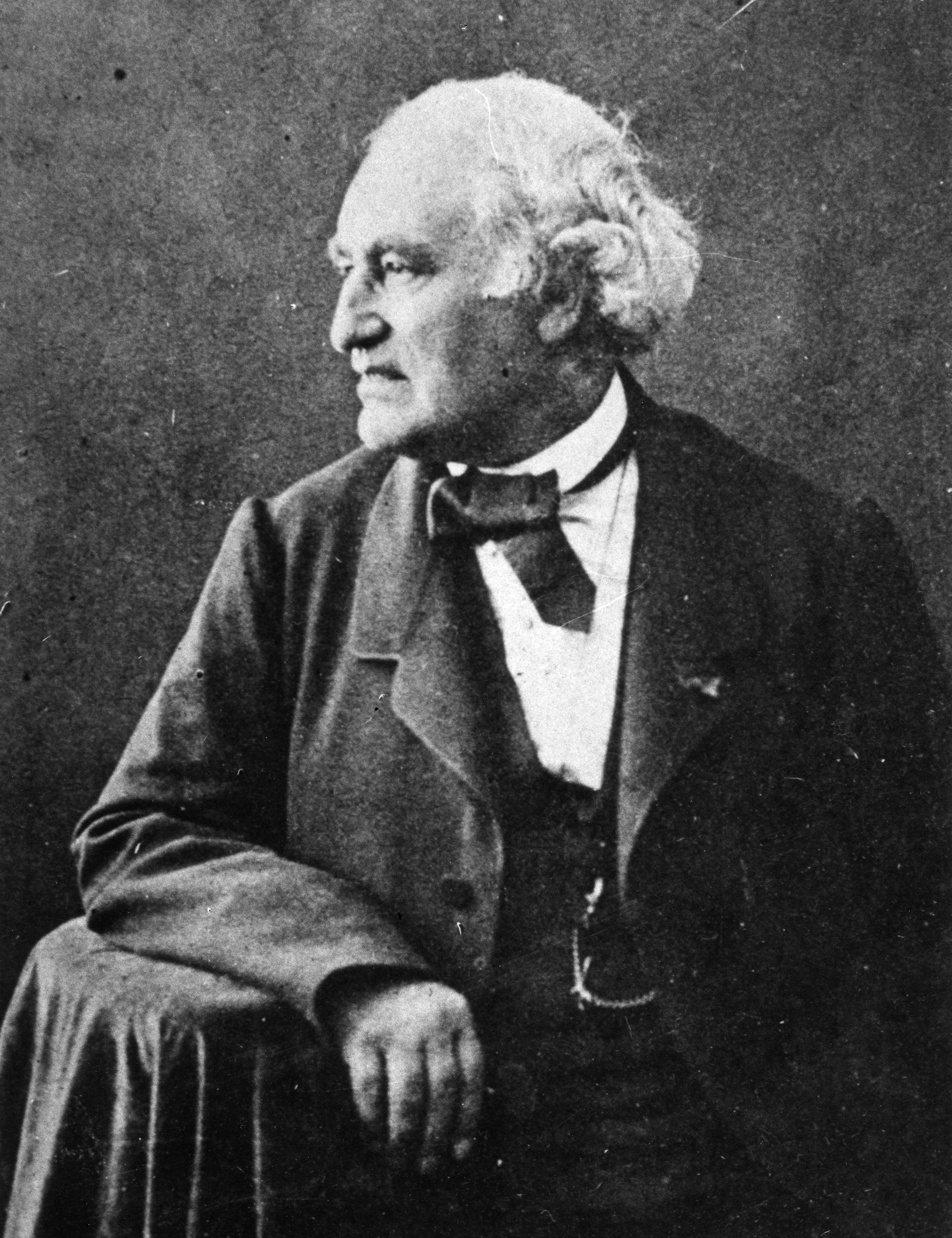
Léon Talabot (1796–1863), president of the first Comité des Maîtres de Forges

In 1850 the French iron masters created an Assemblée Générale des Maîtres de Forges de France, under the presidency of Léon Talabot (1796–1863) head of Denain-Anzin. At the end of the year it took the name of Comité des Maîtres de Forges. In 1855 Talabot assumed the title of president of the Comité des Forges. In 1860 Talabot also became president of a new Association for the Defense of National Labor, which was opposed to lowering of tariffs.

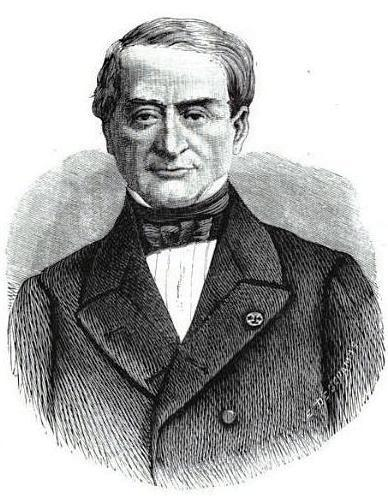
Eugène Schneider, the first President, in 1869

What would become the Comité des forges was founded at a meeting on 15 February 1864, with representatives of foundries that produced over 20,000 tonnes of pig iron or 15,000 tonnes of steel annually. The committee had the goals of managing relations between the industry and government, promoting exports and coordinating prices. Eugène Schneider (1805–75) was the first President and Jules Hochet (1813–67) was chosen as vice-president. There were ten members, each representing a region: Benoist d'Azy (Gard), de Bouchaud (Loire), Dupont-Dreyfus (Moselle), Germain (Commentry), Hamoir (Sambre), Hochet (Berry), Schneider (Le Creusot), Strohl (Franche-Comté), Waternau (Nord-Escaut), de Wendel (Hayange). The Committee was to meet four times annually.

== Early years ==
From the start, the Comité des forges intervened with the government to influence tariffs and social policies. The committee also played an important role in defining production quotas and allocating markets. It was secretive, and this gave it a reputation for having great influence. However, the members often disagreed with each other, and the government often ignored its requests. The Comité des forges was always handicapped by divisions between the members from the center, the north and the east of the country. For example, Charles de Wendel of Hayange in Lorraine resented the control of the committee exerted by Schneider of Le Creusot in Burgundy. In the early years the leading participants could not come to agreement on any meaningful action.

It was not until 1880, when French metallurgy was in crisis, that the Comité des forges began to meet regularly. In 1886 it voted to undertake a program to regulate production and markets. Components included an allocation to each member of part of the domestic market, a uniform way to classify and price iron and steel, penalties for over-production and a fund to encourage exports. The Comité des Forges reorganized itself under the new law on syndicats in 1887, and gave itself a constitution. It was democratic in theory, but in practice the largest companies had control. The Board of Directors (Commission de direction) had wide powers and disposed of the sizeable central funds.

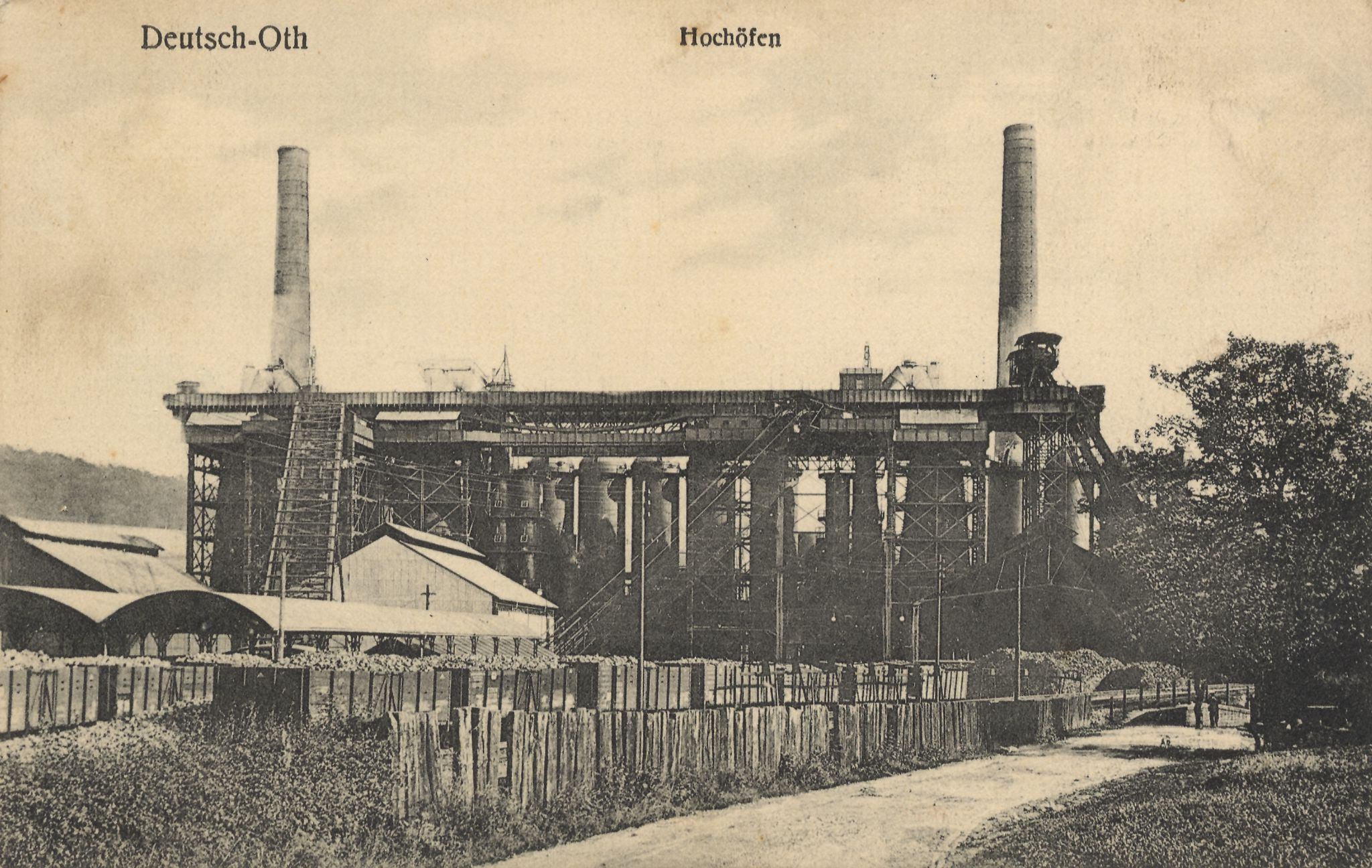
Blast furnaces in Audun-le-Tiche

In 1891 representatives of the Comité des forges gave full support for the risque professionnel principle under which the employers should pay for insurance of victims of workplace accidents, with benefit amounts to be defined by law. After the moderate Méline tariff of 1892 effectively shut out foreign competition from the French steel market, the Comité des forges evolved into an efficient moderate lobbying organization with full-time employees and direct access to senior civil servants and politicians. It participated in legislative decisions and in drafting bills. In 1896 Maurice (Henri?) Pinget was secretary of the Comité des forges and Baron René Reille, a Deputy, was President. Henri Schneider of Creusot was vice-president. After Reille's death in 1898 Robert de Wendel was elected president after some resistance. He owned properties in France and Lorraine, then part of Germany, and this raised some questions.

Robert Pinot was appointed secretary general in 1904. The Comité des Forges had become dormant, but Pinot soon brought it back to being the leading heavy industry organization. From 1906 to 1910 the Comité des forges was active in shaping the laws that gave workers a weekly day of rest, ensuring the regulations recognized that workers had to operate blast furnaces that ran around the clock seven days a week.

During debates over tariffs in 1909–10 Pinot argued for protection on the basis of the importance of the iron and steel industry to national defense and the difficulty it faced in competing with foreign firms that had lower costs and greater access to skilled labor. The Comité des forges included engineering firms that purchased steel and were not in favor of high duties, but Pinot managed to maintain solidarity through a complex system of cartels and syndicates. The Comité des Forges was attacked by the Left, which threatened nationalization, and failed to get political support for a policy to promote national industrial development, reduce regulation and resist socialist demands for labor laws that would drive up costs.

== World War I ==
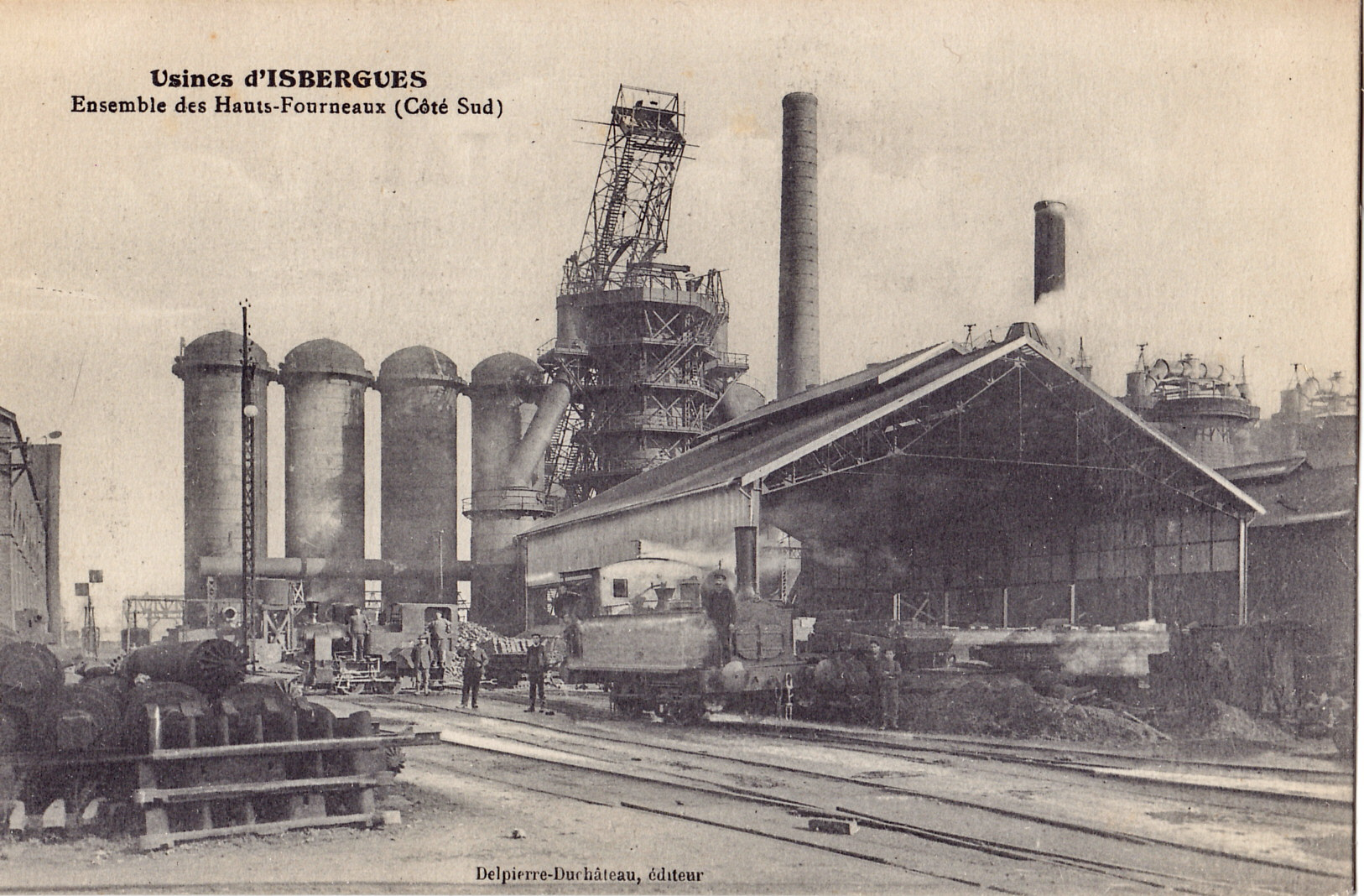
Delpierre-Duchateau - Usines d'Isbergues

During World War I (1914–18) the common interests of the armaments industry were represented by the Comité des Forges and the Chambre syndicale des fabrications de matériel de guerre, both dominated by heavy industry. Charles François Laurent succeeded Florent Guillain (1844–1915) as president of the Comité des forges. Robert Pinot continued to serve as secretary general of the CFF under Laurent, as he did under Laurent's successor Gabriel Cordier. Léon Alphonse Lévy (1851–1925), director of the Société des forges de Châtillon-Commentry-Neuves-Maisons, was a vice-president of the Comité des Forges and president of the Chambre syndicale.

The war economy was organized as a cartel of the great armament firms, coordinated by the Comité des Forges. The Committee was responsible for buying coal in London and supervising sales of steel abroad. In May 1916 the Comité des forges obtained a monopoly over import of pig iron from Great Britain. The state sometimes saw the war industry as a partner, sometimes as a competitor for power, and at times tried to deal directly with individual industrialists and bypass the Comité des Forges.

The industry profited from the lack of social rights of mobilized workers, who had been called up for the army and then assigned to industry, and paid wages below pre-war levels despite the boom in business and the rising prices. In 1915 it demanded compulsory assignment of civilian workers to prevent them leaving their jobs to accept better pay elsewhere. The Comité des Forges proposed to compensate for low wages by a generous distribution of medals (the Médaille du Travail) for particularly conscientious workers. The government rejected compulsory assignment for all workers, but maintained the special status of mobilized workers. This was important for firms like Le Creusot, where 55% of the 20,000 workers were mobilized workers in June 1917.

Towards the end of the war, study groups under Humbert de Wendel, brother of François de Wendel, requested a postwar settlement in which the Saar would be ceded, Alsace-Lorraine returned to France and Luxembourg transferred from the German customs union to a new union with Belgium. The Comité des Forges wanted to keep German steel producers out of French markets, while maintaining free access to German markets from the Lorraine producers. During the war, the scarcity of steel enhanced the power of the Committee. By the end of the war it was running a system of steel producer levies and subsidies to counterbalance differences in costs between the producers, and this system continued for a short time after the Armistice of 11 November 1918.

== Inter-war period ==
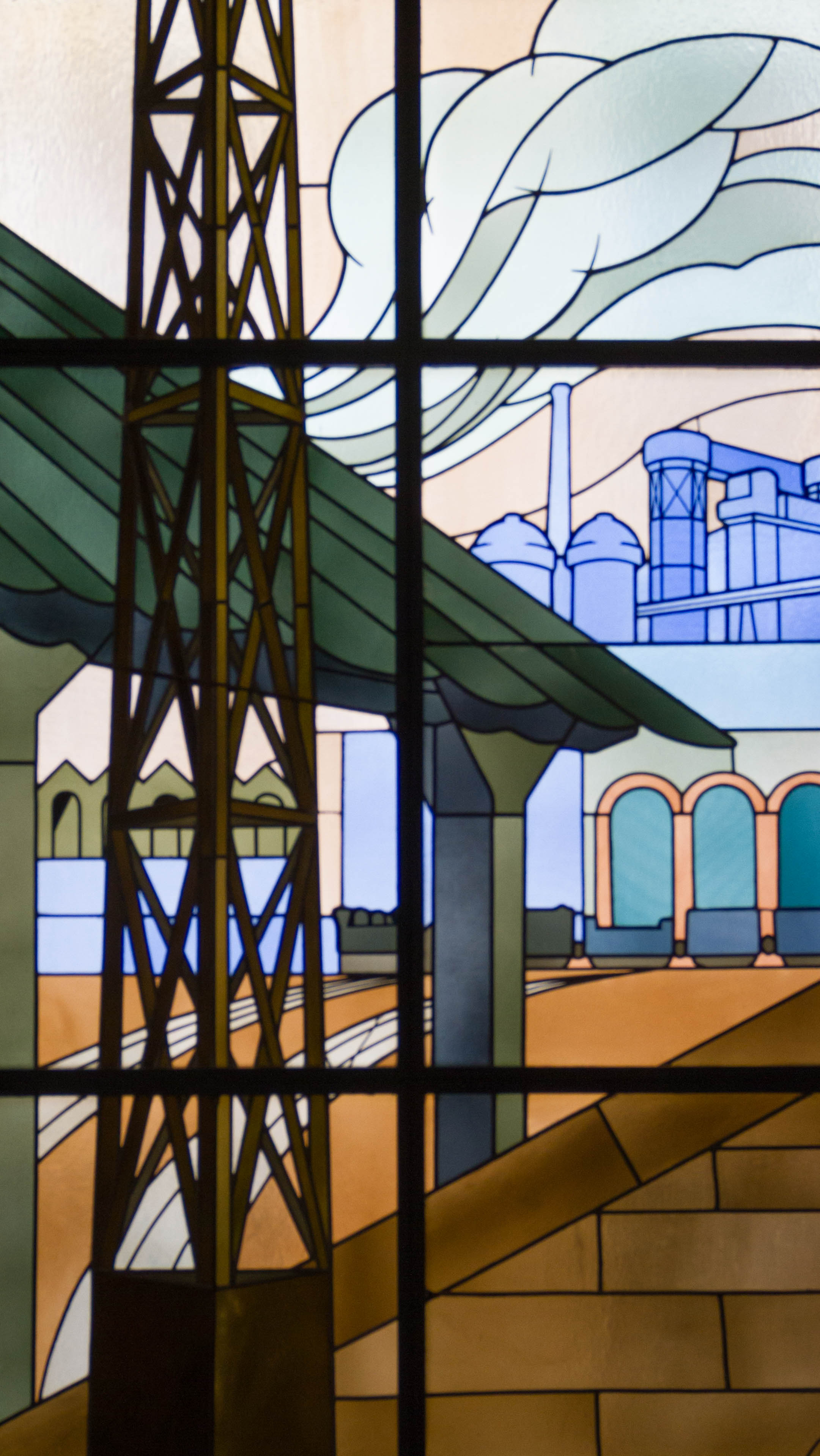
Art deco stained glass, headquarters of the Aciéries de Longwy, by Louis Majorelle

When censorship was relaxed after the war there were bitter complaints against the Comité des forges within and outside Parliament. It was said that the Comité des forges had allowed France to fall behind in industrialization before the war, and that the Comité des forges had colluded with the army to prevent bombing of the French steel works in the Briey region that had been taken by the Germans early in the war. The general secretary Robert Pinot defended himself and the steel masters, but the suspicion lingered and the Comité des Forges was attacked by the Left throughout the years that followed. A shift of power within heavy manufacturing was underway during the interwar years as new industries such as car and airplane manufacture grew in importance, often with interests in conflict with the steel makers.

In December 1918 the Comité des forges created the Comptoir sidérurgique de France, which allocated quotas to members of the steel cartel. During the war the government had run the National Coal Bureau with a system under which small steel producers who could not get cheap domestic coal were subsidized in buying more expensive imports. After the war the Comité des forges president François de Wendel asked that this function be transferred to a consortium organized by the Committee. The small producers were opposed to this measure, which seemed likely to confirm the advantage of the large companies. In 1923 the Comité des forges asked for either a customs barrier between the Ruhr and Germany so that the French steel producers could get cheaper coal than the Germans, or else a takeover of the German coal mines, which would be leased to the French steel producers.

In the post-war period the Union des industries et métiers de la métallurgie (UIMM) acted in effect as the instrument of the Comité des forges for handling social issues. In 1919 Robert Pinot was secretary of both organizations. In 1921 Pinot asked Francois de Wendel to make him a vice-president of the Comité des forges. Although Pinot was committed and efficient, he had a tendency to take credit for the Committee's actions. He was an employee rather than an owner, and de Wendel made it clear he would only be the most junior of five vice-presidents, with no prospect of becoming president. During and immediately after the war there was tension within the UIMM when the engineering industry challenged the dominance of the Comité des forges, but the steel interests won the battle. The UIMM provided logistic support to the Confédération générale de la production française (CGPF), the general employers association, with the result that the CGPF was accused of being simply a puppet of the steel industry.

In 1923 the Société d'études et d'informations économiques, formed by the Comité des forges, published studies by the economist Paul de Rousiers defending "good" agreements. In the 1930s the Comité des forges continued to publish the Bulletin de la société d'études et d'information, edited by Émile Mireaux then by Jacques Bardoux. During the 1930s, on many subjects it was hard to get agreement among the members. The interests of large firms often clashed with those of smaller firms, firms that produced for the state clashed with firms that wanted lower state spending and lower taxes, firms that consumed coal clashed with the coal mines. At times the Comité des forges was reduced to preparing alternative policy proposals for a single issue. Talking of meetings of the committee, one participant said "We splutter and argue, conversations go on for ever and everyone talks at the same time."

The Comité des forges helped finance the right wing Faisceau, Redressement Français and Croix-de-Feu groups via intermediaries such as Pierre Pucheu. In 1936 Alexandre Lambert-Ribot, secretary general of the Comité des forges, signed the Matignon Agreements to end the general strike that followed election of the Popular Front. The Matignon Agreements forced a change in the leadership of the CGPF employer's organization, renamed the Confédération générale du patronat français (CGPF), but this was approved by the heavy industrialists, There were, for example, close links between Pierre Nicolle of the CGPF and François de Wendel.

== Dissolution ==
Under the Vichy regime the Comité des forges was dissolved by decree on 9 November 1940. It was replaced by the Comité d'organisation de la sidérurgie (CORSID – Organizing Committee for the Iron and Steel Industry). The only member of the Comité des forges to be appointed to CORSID was Léon Daum of the Compagnie des forges et aciéries de la marine et d'Homécourt. The Commission générale was created in 1941, with similar membership to the Comité des forges: five members were removed and three added. Alfred Lambert-Ribot (1886–1967), secretary-general of the committee until the end, was one of those removed, presumably because of the way he had criticized the Vichy regime after it took power. The commission had a consultative role, but Jules Aubrun and the other CORSID members now coordinated the steel industry. The significant change was to pass control from the presidents of the largest steelworks to senior managers of second-ranked steelworks.

== Notable members ==
Notable members of the Comité des forges included:

Name	Position	Years	Company
Eugène Schneider (1805–75)	President	1864–68	Schneider-Creusot
Adrien de Montgolfier-Verpilleux (1831–1913)	President	1880	Compagnie des forges et aciéries de la marine et d'Homécourt
René Reille (1835–1898)	President	1890–98	Compagnie minière de Carmaux, Deputy of Tarn
Robert de Wendel (1847–1903)	President	1898–1903	Hayange, Moyeuvre-Grande and Stiring-Wendel
Robert de Nervo (1842–1909)	President	1903	Ateliers et Chantiers de la Loire
Florent Guillain (1844–1915)	President	1904–15	Marine-Homécourt, Deputy of Nord, Minister of the Colonies
Charles Laurent (1856–1939)	President	1915–20	Compagnie Francaise Thomson-Houston
François de Wendel (1874–1949)	President	1918–40	Wendel et Cie, Deputy of Lorraine
Robert Pinot (1862–1926)	Secretary General	1904	Union des industries et métiers de la métallurgie
Alfred Lambert-Ribot (1886–1967)	Secretary General	–1940	
Léon Alphonse Lévy (1851–1925)	Vice President	1891	Société des forges de Châtillon-Commentry-Neuves-Maisons
Léopold Pralon (1855–1938)	Vice President	1904	Société de Denain et d'Anzin
Théodore Laurent (1863–1953)	Vice President	c. 1928	
Fernand de Saintignon (1846–1921)	Management committee	1881	F. de Saintignon et Cie
Armand Resimont (1847–1917)	Management committee	1887	Société du Nord et de l'Est
Fayol, Henri (1841–1926)	Management committee	1900	Société de Commentry, Fourchambault et Decazeville
Georges Rolland (1852–1910)	Management committee	1903	Société des aciéries de Longwy
Camille Cavallier (1854–1926)	Management committee		Pont-à-Mousson iron works
Auguste Dondelinger (1876–1940)	Management committee	1923	Société Métallurgique de Senelle-Maubeuge
Jules Aubrun (1881–1959)	Management committee	1927	Citroën
Mercier, Louis (1856–1927)	Member	1878	Compagnie des mines de Béthune
Antoine Faugier (1846–1906)	Member	1882	Usines Faugier

== Sources ==
- Brunet, Luc-André (8 June 2017), Forging Europe: Industrial Organisation in France, 1940–1952, Springer, ISBN 978-1-349-95198-7
- Bulletin du Comite Permanent (in French), vol. 7, Paris: Congres International des Accidents du Travail et des Assurance Sociales, 1896
- Cassis, Youssef (1999), Big Business: The European Experience in the Twentieth Century, Oxford University Press, ISBN 978-0-19-829606-5
- "Comité des forges", Encyclopédie Larousse (in French), Éditions Larousse
- Ehrmann, Henry Walter (8 December 2015), Organized Business in France, Princeton University Press, ISBN 978-1-4008-7832-1
- Forges (Comité des) (in French), Patrons de France
- Fraboulet, Danièle (2007), Quand les patrons s'organisent: Stratégies et pratiques de l'UIMM 1901-1950 (in French), Presses Univ. Septentrion, ISBN 978-2-85939-994-8
- Gill, Graeme (15 May 2008), Bourgeoisie, State and Democracy: Russia, Britain, France, Germany, and the USA, OUP Oxford, ISBN 978-0-19-954468-4
- Gille, Bertrand (1968), La Sidérurgie française au XIXe siècle: Recherches histioriques (in French), Librairie Droz, ISBN 978-2-600-04046-4
- Guérin-Brot, Isabelle, Comité des forges de France 41 AS (PDF) (in French), Archives Nationales
- Guillaume, Sylvie (2008), Les PME Dans Les Sociétés Contemporaines de 1880 À Nos Jours: Pouvoir, Représentation, Action (in French), Peter Lang, ISBN 978-90-5201-432-6
- Hardach, G., "La Mobilisation Industrielle", 19141918 L'Autre Front (in French), Editions de l'Atelier, GGKEY:1FJ7TH7RLZ9
- James, Harold (2006), FAMILY CAPITALISM, Harvard University Press, ISBN 978-0-674-02181-5
- Kuisel, Richard F. (29 April 1983), Capitalism and the State in Modern France: Renovation and Economic Management in the Twentieth Century, CUP Archive, ISBN 978-0-521-27378-7
- Maier, Charles S. (27 October 2015), Recasting Bourgeois Europe: Stabilization in France, Germany, and Italy in the Decade after World War I, Princeton University Press, ISBN 978-1-4008-7370-8
- Mares, Isabela (7 July 2003), The Politics of Social Risk: Business and Welfare State Development, Cambridge University Press, ISBN 978-0-521-53477-2
- Priouret, Roger (4 February 1992), Origines du patronat français, Grasset, ISBN 978-2-246-79486-8
- Schmidt, Royal J. (6 December 2012), Versailles and the Ruhr: Seedbed of World War II, Springer, ISBN 978-94-015-1081-3
- Smith, Michael Stephen (2006), The Emergence of Modern Business Enterprise in France, 1800-1930, Harvard University Press, ISBN 978-0-674-01939-3
- Soucy, Robert (31 January 1997), French Fascism: The Second Wave, 1933-1939, Yale University Press, ISBN 978-0-300-07043-9
- Stone, Judith F. (1985), The Search for Social Peace: Reform Legislation in France, 1890-1914, SUNY Press, ISBN 978-0-88706-022-9
- Thomson, David (18 June 1968), France: Empire and Republic, 1850–1940: Historical Documents, Palgrave Macmillan UK, ISBN 978-1-349-00578-9
- Vinen, Richard (8 August 2002), The Politics of French Business 1936-1945, Cambridge University Press, ISBN 978-0-521-52240-3
