= Pierre-Alpinien Bourdeau =

French deputy

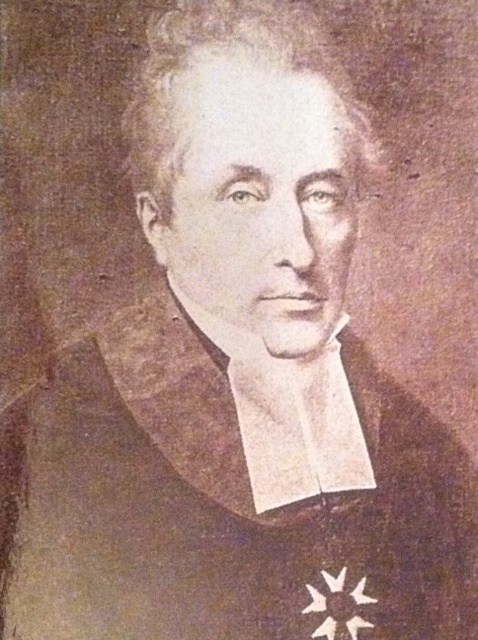
- Born: 18 March 1779; Rochechouart, Haute-Vienne
- Died: 11 July 1845 (aged 66); Limoges, Haute-Vienne
- Occupation: Politician
- Known for: Minister of Justice

Pierre Alpinien Bertrand Bourdeau (18 March 1770 – 11 July 1845) was a French deputy from 1815 to 1831 and from 1834 to 1836. He was briefly Minister of Justice in 1829, and was made a peer of France during the July Monarchy. He is known for his hostility to the press, and for trying to hold newspaper managers responsible for libels published after they had left the paper.

== Early years ==
Pierre Alpinien Bertrand Bourdeau was born in Rochechouart, Haute-Vienne, on 18 March 1770. His father was an "advocate in parliament" in the provinces of Poitou, Angoumois, Périgord, who acted as counsel for the town of Rochechouart. Bourdeau registered as an advocate at the court of Limoges on 3 December 1790. Bourdeau joined the revolutionary movement enthusiastically, but during the Terror (5 September 1793 – 28 July 1794) he was treated as a suspect and imprisoned at Limoges and then Tulle. He was released after 9 Thermidor. Bourdeau practiced as an advocate at the bar of Limoges until 1815. He was a freemason.

After the first Bourbon Restoration Bourdeau was appointed deputy mayor of Limoges due to his royalist views. He was thrown out of office when Napoleon returned during the Hundred Days, but after the Bourbons returned from Ghent he was reinstated, and was appointed Attorney General at the Court of Limoges.

== Bourbon Restoration deputy ==
Bourdeau was elected deputy for Haute-Vienne on 22 August 1815. In 1816 Bourdeau was appointed Attorney General at the Court of Rennes. He was reelected to the Chamber of Deputies on 4 October 1816 and on 13 November 1820. Bourdeau sat with the ultra-royalists. He voted for institution of provost courts, for the law against sedition, for the "amnesty law" of 12 January 1816, for the suspension of the freedom of the press. He even stated that ministers did not have to answer questions. To demand explanations would be to encroach on royal authority and show lack of confidence in the king's ministers. He also opposed the right of petition.

On 25 February 1824 Bourdeau was reelected for Haute-Vienne (Limoges). Thinking that the Ministry of Joseph de Villèle would soon fall, Bourdeau joined the opposition and voted against the ministry. He was dismissed from his position as attorney general. He voted consistently against the administration of Villèle and Peyronnet. In 1825 he spoke out against the proposal for conversion of annuities, which he expected to result in rampant speculation. He opposed a proposed law on sacrilege in 1825, and the next year spoke against the encroachments of the clergy when discussing a petition from a village priest who asked for reconciliation of the civil and canon laws concerning marriage.

In the run-up to the 1827 elections Bourdeau led a very successful drive in Limoges to convince eligible voters to register and support the liberal cause. Bourdeau's mandate was renewed in the election of 17 November 1827. After the fall of the Villèle ministry, in 1828 Jean Baptiste Gay, vicomte de Martignac, named him Director General of Registration and Domains, and Councilor of State. The next year he was named Undersecretary of State for Justice. On 14 May 1829 he was appointed Minister of Justice, holding office until the Martignac ministry fell on 8 August 1829. In his short term of office he displayed severity against the press. Four days after leaving the ministry Bourdeau was appointed first president of Limoges and Grand Officer of the Legion of Honor. He was reelected to the Chamber of Deputies on 23 June 1830.

== July Monarchy ==
After the July Revolution of 1830 Bourdeau swore allegiance to the July Monarchy.That year he again registered at the bar of the court of appeal in Limoges, but continued his political activity. He was not reelected until 1834. On 21 June 1834 he was returned for Haute-Vienne (Limoges) and joined the government majority. His health obliged him to resign the next year. He was replaced by Léon Talabot, who was elected on 23 January 1836. He was made a peer of France on 3 October 1837.

In 1841 Bourdeau won an action for defamation against the newspapers La Gazette du Centre and Le Progressif de la Haute-Vienne. Le Progressif, a radical newspaper in Limoges, was fined 10,000 francs damages. When the newspaper was found to have insufficient funds, Bourdeau tried to have the sum made up by managers who had left the newspaper before the libel occurred. The court did not accept this system of retrospective complicity, which was publicized in the press of the time as "Bourdeau justice."

Alpinien Bourdeau died in Limoges, Haute-Vienne, on 11 July 1845.
