= Carmaux, défournage du coke =

- Produced by: Lumière
- Distributed by: Lumière
- Release date: 1896
- Running time: 38 seconds
- Country: France
- Languages: Silent film French intertitles

Carmaux, défournage du coke (translated as Drawing Out the coke) is a French silent film made in 1896 by Lumière. The location was the Saut-du-Tarn Steel Works at Carmaux, near the river Tarn in southern France. It is a one-minute sequence of men lifting a large coal block out of a smelter. One man is spraying water to cool the block while others use rakes to spread it out. Others can be seen pushing coal carts along a track.

== See also ==
- Lumière
- Carmaux
- Coal
