= Société Mokta El Hadid =

Algerian mining company

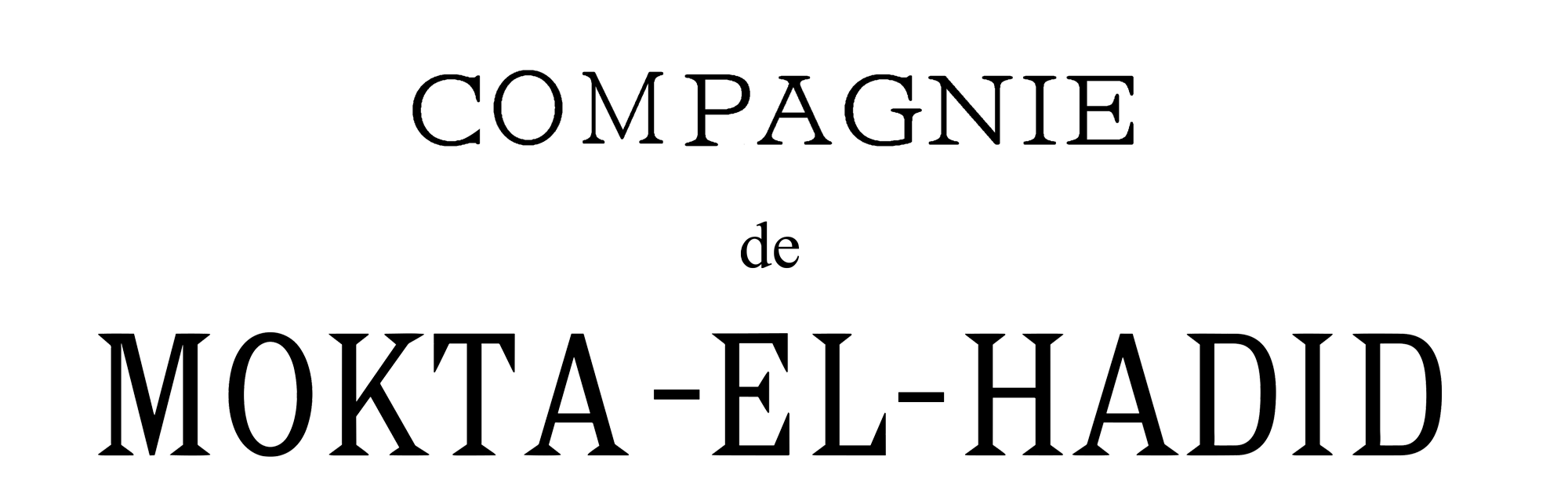

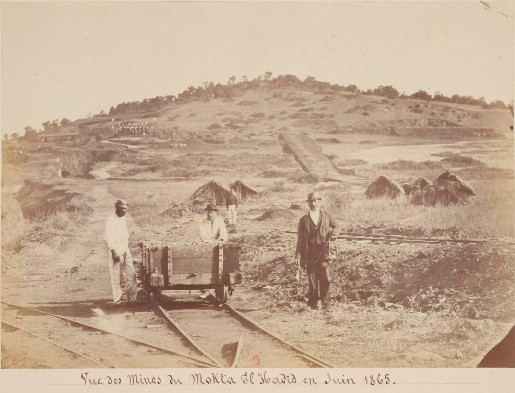
- View of the mines in June 1865
- Industry: Mining
- Founded: 1863; 163 years ago
- Founder: Paulin Talabot
- Defunct: October 1970; 55 years ago
- Headquarters: Algeria
- Products: Iron ore

The Société Mokta El Hadid was an iron ore mining company in Algeria, and later in other West African countries. From around 1865 until 1927, it was the largest mining company in Algeria, delivering ore for processing in France. In 1878 the original Mokta El Hadid mine near Bône (now Annaba) was said to be capable of supporting 25% of Europe's steel production. Before this mine was exhausted, the company opened additional mines in Algeria. Later it extended its operations to countries such as Tunisia, Morocco, Niger, Côte-d'Ivoire and Madagascar, and mined manganese, chromium and uranium. In October 1970 the Société le Nickel, soon to become the Imétal holding company, took over the Mokta company. The company was later renamed Compagnie française de Mokta (CFM), specializing in uranium mining.

== First discovery ==
Locations in Algeria

The mine is about 22 miles (35 km) from the port of Bône in the Mokta hill beside at the foot of a mountain chain that runs from south to north, then turns east to Bône. The name "Mokta-el-Hadid" (the iron pass) indicates that the presence of iron has long been known, but there is no sign that it was worked before the first small-scale attempts in 1840. The geologist Henri Fournel discovered the deposits of magnetite in 1843.

The businessman Paulin Talabot had a "Mediterranean dream" involving "the exploitation of the mines of the Bône region, which would feed his coal mines in the Grand-Combe by means of rapid transport in his ships of the Compagnie Générale Transatlantique, relayed by his Algerian railroad cars and those of the PLM." Before Fournel's survey was complete, in 1845 the Talabots or their associates had obtained three of the four concessions in the Bône region. Algeria in the 19th century did not have coking coal, so did not process its iron ore. Instead, the ore was shipped to the coast and sold to a shipper, who in turn sold it to European steel mills for about twice the price. Talabot thought of building an ironworks at Bône, but abandoned the idea in 1848 partly due to the danger of attack by the Algerians and in part to a threatened boycott of Algerian iron ore by the Schneiders of Le Creusot.

A report by Fournel to the Académie des sciences on 14 May 1848 said, "to the north of Lake F'Zara there is a whole mountain, the Mokta-el-Hadid (the quarry of iron) which emerges from the gneisses and literally presents from foot to top, that is to say over a height of more than one hundred meters, a mass of pure oxidized iron, with no admixture of rock. To the east of this deposit, which few deposits known elsewhere could parallel, the oxidized iron pierces several other points." Talabot asked the geologist Émilien Dumas to assess the deposit. He contacted the polytechnician and engineer of mines Alphonse Parran to form the new company and start exploitation.

Due to shortage of both labour and capital, little progress was made and in 1849 the government revoked the three Talabot concessions. In 1852 they were restored after Napoleon III had taken power.

Meanwhile, Eugène de Bassano, a Paris entrepreneur better known as Marquis de Bassano, founded the Société Civile des Mines et Hauts Fourneaux des Karezas, which had the concession to exploit a deposit in Meboudja between Bône and Aïn-Mokra (now Berrahal), which was called the Karezas mine. The company built a narrow-gauge railway to transport the iron ore from the mine to a harbour on the Seybouse River near Bône. The place was called Allélik and was 6 km south of Bône. It is where the ironworks and blast furnaces for processing the ore were located. The 11 km long railway with a gauge of 1.055 mm opened in 1853 and was the first railway built in Algeria, however it was not open to public transport.

In 1857 the Mokta el Hadid mine was founded, and the Talabots gained the concession. The ore was in a vein 2,500 metres (8,200 ft) long and 10 to 50 metres (33 to 164 ft) wide. The magnetite ore was 70% pure iron. This ore, free of sulfur and phosphorus, was much more suitable for the Bessemer and Martin processes than the poorer ores high in phosphorus that are typical of France, Belgium, Luxembourg and Germany.

Plans for a merger with the steelworks at Alais in the Gard were drawn up, possibly part of a larger merger with the mines of the Grand-Combe, but stalled. In 1863 the Société de Mokta el Hadid was established definitively. It took over the operation of the Société Civile des Mines et Hauts Fourneaux des Karezas mentioned above. Plans were drawn up to combine the Mokta el Hadid mines with the Firminy, Loire, steelworks, the Gard coal mines and the Saut-du-Tarn steelworks near Albi, Tarn. 20 million francs of capital would be needed, including 8 million of fresh capital for upgrades at the various sites. These plans also dragged out.

== Mokta el Hadid mine ==
Extensive construction was undertaken at Bône in 1856–69 to build an 80 hectares (200 acres) sheltered port facility to handle the ore from Mokta el Hadid. In 1862 the existing railway line from the port at the Seybouse river to the Karezas mine site was extended to the mine at Ain Mokra. The extension opened in 1864 and brought the total length of the railway line to 35 km. At that time the mine employed 3,000 people, mainly Italians. Full-scale production began in 1865. Before the mine was opened Bône had 10,000 inhabitants. By 1924 there were 41,000 and the port was being used to export phosphates, lead and zinc ore. The arrival in large volumes of Algerian ores from Mokta-el-Hadid upset the supply chain in France. The success at the Firminy plant in making steel rails using only ore from the Algerian mines was a major argument for installation of furnaces based on the Martin process at Le Creusot. In 1865 Eugène Schneider had reached an agreement with Paulin Talabot to obtain a large supply of Algerian ore, making it possible to start intensive steel production.

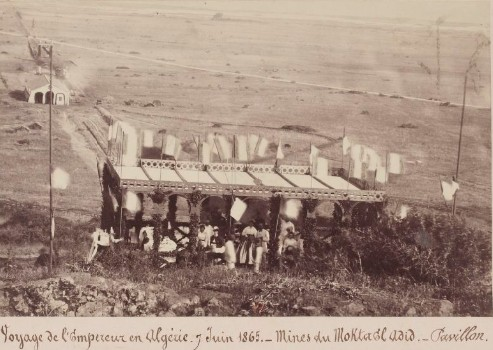
Napoleon III dining in a tent at the mine site (1865)

In 1865 Napoleon III came to Algeria and made a trip to the mine and the city of Bône. A photograph survives of the emperor and his entourage taking refreshment under a tent at the mine site. Paulin Talabot founded the Société Générale Algérienne (SGA) in 1865 to promote economic growth in the colony of Algeria, which created five villages for French colonists. It was granted 100,000 hectares (250,000 acres) of land in exchange for a 100 million franc loan to Napoleon III, which was spent on Algerian public works. After experiencing some financial difficulties the SGA was reorganized as the Compagnie Algérienne in 1877.

In 1865 the mine produced 22,000 tons, rising to 255,000 tons in 1869. The ore was extracted from underground galleries and shipped from Bône to the main French steelworks. In 1870 Algeria as a whole exported 84,710 tons of iron ore. In the 1870s 2/3 of all miners in Algeria were working the Mokta-el-Hadid mine. In 1874 the Mokta el Hadid mine alone shipped 430,000 tons of ore, containing 260,000 tons of iron. At this time Britain was producing a total of 500,000 tons of steel. The mine was said to be capable of supporting 25% of Europe's steel production. In 1875–76 the Bou Djima River, which was carrying silt into the port, was diverted to the Seybouse River. The railway could now be extended to the port, considerably reducing transport costs.

Alphonse Parran remained head of the company until 1900. Philippe de Cerner took over management of the Mokta-el-Hadid mine in 1875. Output from the 14 iron ore mines in Algeria rose to 511,000 tons in 1876, then started to decline. In 1879 the country exported 400,000 tons, of which 320,000 tons came from Mokta-el-Hadid. Very little of the ore was smelted before export. The port of Bône shipped only 148,695 tons of ore in 1893. Mining at Mokta el Hadid ended in 1904.

== Lake of Fetzara ==
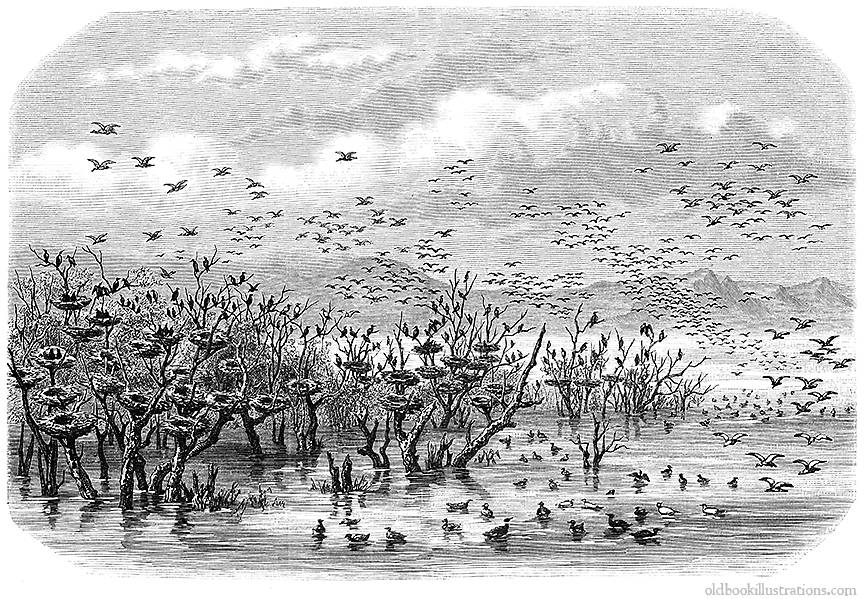
Lake of Fetzara in 1857 before being drained by the company

The mine is beside the Lake of Fetzara. When it started operation the lake's surface elevation would have reached 16 metres (52 ft) in winter, with an area of 14,000 hectares (35,000 acres). The lake was bordered with reeds and rushes, used for nesting by migratory birds, and was rich in fish. The lake was considered a source of fever, and a 16 kilometres (9.9 mi) drainage channel flowing into the Oued Meboudja was proposed, but although the SGA had rights to the northern and eastern shores of the lake it did nothing.

In the 1870s the company planted many eucalyptus trees around the Lake of Fetzara. A report published in 1901 said, "The example of Lake Fetzara has been much quoted; its marshy miasma infected the large mining works of Mokta-el-Hadid, decimated the staff, and rendered existence in this locality insupportable. Now, thanks to well developed forests of Eucalyptus, it presents all the conditions of a tolerable hygiene." The report then noted that the improvement could also be attributed in part to better medical attention and the fact that most of the staff commuted to work from Bône. The trees were all killed by salt water seeping from the lake. In 1877 the Mokta El Hadid company gained permission to drain the lake in exchange for free transfer of the reclaimed land. A channel led from the center of the lake, crossed the 22 metres (72 ft) western flank and led to the Meboudja. The surface elevation had dropped to 12 metres (39 ft) by 1880, but the lake remained swampy in summer. After 1903 the company ceded its rights to the Lake of Fetzara to the SGA colony, which took over the work and completed it in 1935.

== Other operations ==
As of 1878, the company had also opened the Kareza, Bou H'amra and Marouania mines. Before the Mokta deposits started showing signs of running out Alphonse Parran obtained the deposit of Rar El Baroud near Béni Saf in 1879. The ore in the Béni Saf region near Montagnac (now named Remchi) is hematite with 2% manganese. Between 1867 and 1947 the region produced 30 million metric tons of ore. Alphonse Parran was also involved in one of the first iron ore mines in Kryvbas (then Russia, now Ukraine) in 1881 and the Gafsa phosphate deposits in Tunisia in 1886. In Tunisia, as of 1893, the company owned concessions at Ras Radjid, Bou lanague, Dj Bellif and Ganara in the Kroumine between Tabarka and Cap Serrat. The ores, which had not yet been worked, were brown and red hematites with an average of 50% iron.

By 1895, the company had bought all the iron ore beds in the Ouelhasses Cheragas ore district of Algeria apart from Boukourdan. These included the Das rih and Bar el Baroud beds of Béni Saf, and the Ten Kreut, Djed el Haouraia and Sidi-safi groups of ore beds. Only the Bar el Baroud was being worked, using open-cut mining to extract ore with at least 55% iron. The port of Béni Saf was operated privately by the company, which had built it and had a 99-year lease. Estimated output was 291,547 metric tons in 1892 and 203,338 tons in 1893. Destinations, in order, were England, the Netherlands, France, the US and Belgium. The company obtained the Boukhadra deposits near the Tunisian border in 1902.

In the period from 1900 to 1930, the company was among the powerful capitalist groups in the French colonial empire that provided exceptional rates of profit. Alphonse Parran was succeeded as head of the company in 1900 by Édouard de Billy (1866–1919). Billy was replaced in 1918 by Charles-Émile Heurteau (1878–1961), who took the simple title of Director while Léon de Nervo (1873–1973), the heir of Paulin Talabot, took the title of Managing Director. Léon de Nervo was also president of the Société Commerciale de Navigation, which operated three 6,800 ton cargo vessels that carried North African iron ore to European ports and to the US. Heurteau left in the 1920s to take a position as Managing Director at the Marles coal mines. André Duby joined as chief engineer of technical services in 1927, then became co-director with Léon de Nervo, and sole director in the 1940s.

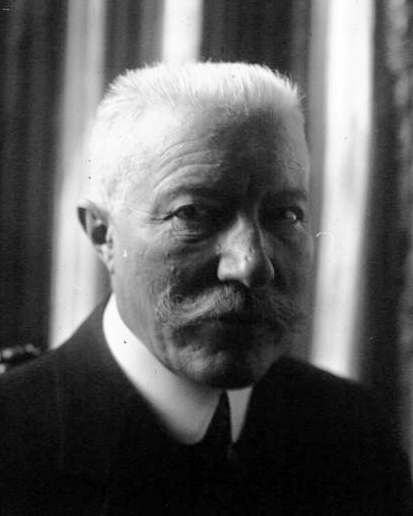
Algerian governor Charles Jonnart blocked construction of local steelworks to process the iron ore

From 1901, the company began using Moroccan workers in its Béni Saf mines. The Compagnie des mines du Djebel-Djerissa was created in 1899 with a capital of 4.5 million francs divided into 9,000 shares of 500 francs. In 1905 the nominal share value was reduced to 400 francs and the capital was reduced to 3.6 million francs. The Société du Djebel-Djerissa became in effect a subsidiary of the Société Mokta El Hadid of Algeria, which took a stake of 5,200 shares in the mine in 1906.

In 1905, the small Mokta railway was connected to the departmental network, connecting the port of Bone to the Jemmapes (Azzaba) region, and now extended as far as Saint-Charles (Ramdane Djamel). Philippe de Cerner, the company manager in Bône, had convinced the government to extend the railway west from Ain Mokra to connect with the main line to Philippeville (Skikda), and then persuaded the government to assume responsibility for running the line in the public interest. Philippe de Cerner was appointed director of the new line from 1908 until his retirement in 1917. In 1912 the Compagnie des minerais de fer magnétique de Mokta-el-Hadid had a capital of 20 million and made a profit of 4.5 million. When World War I began Mokta-el Hadid was one of only two privately owned French colonial companies other than banks and railways with capital of over 20 million francs, the other being the Société Le Nickel in New Caledonia.

In 1917, the Société Mokta El Hadid and the Société des Hauts Fourneaux de Rouen agreed to form a joint venture to exploit the Boukhadra deposits, which was supported by the minister Albert Thomas. However, the administration of governor Charles Lutaud submitted an alternative proposal to the government that required the company to build blast furnaces in Bône and to pay higher royalties to Algeria. The agreement and specifications for this project were signed early in 1918, with 85% of the capital supplied by Mokta and Hauts Fourneaux de Rouen, and 15% by Denain-Anzin and a consortium of Algerian banks. Two blast furnaces would be built with combined annual capacity of 80,000 tons. However, after Charles Jonnart returned to Algeria as governor the project was delayed and eventually cancelled.

In May 1919, the company's miners went on strike in solidarity with strikers in other industries, but the strike quickly fizzled out. Mokta el Hadid was the largest mining company in Algeria until 1927, when it was overtaken by the Société de l'Ouenza. The Mokta el Hadid iron ore mining company was responsible for creation of SACEM in 1929. SACEM (Société anonyme chérifienne d'études minières), based in Casablanca, Morocco, was founded to exploit the Imini manganese mines. (Note: As of 2009 SACEM was continuing to exploit the Imimi deposits in Ouarzazate, Morocco.) The ratio of Société Mokta El Hadid share prices to earnings fluctuated from 3.0 in 1929 up to 11.0 in 1933, falling back to 1.8 by 1937.

== Post-World War II ==
After World War II, the Mokta El Hadid iron ore belonged to the Mirabaud Group. As of 1950. the company was capitalized at 5.1 billion francs, one of the top 2 on the Paris Bourse. In 1951. the Société de l'Ouenza produced 60% of Algerian iron, 85% in Ouenza and 15% in Bou-Kadra. Mokta-el-Hadid was the second iron ore mining company in Algeria, with many subsidiaries and several concessions, including in Morocco. Henri Lafond was head of the Banque de l'Union Parisienne from 1951, which controlled Mokta El Hadid, and was also head of SACEM. Lafond headed the Mokta company until his death in 1963.

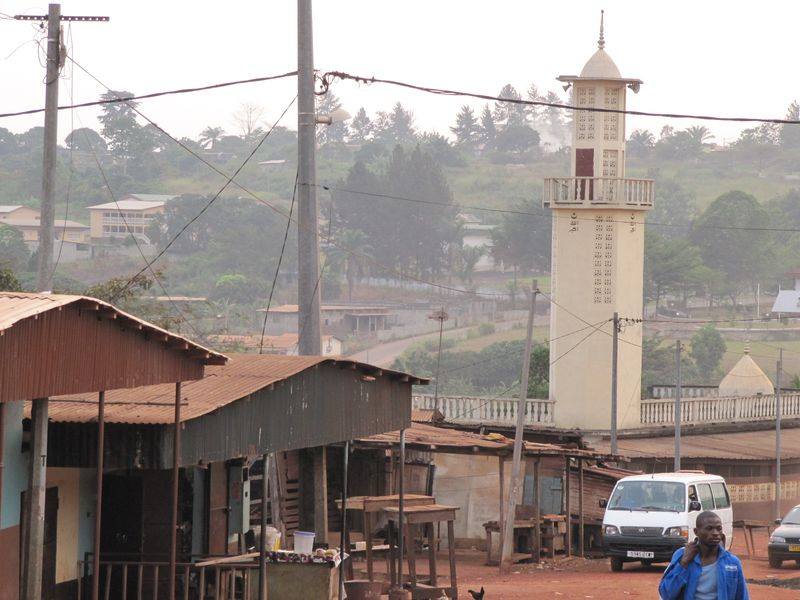
Moanda, Gabon, location of a manganese mining joint venture

On 24 April 1953. a joint corporation was established to mine a deposit estimated at 50 million tons of manganese ore in Gabon owned by the Bureau of Mines of Overseas France (21%), Eastern Tjbangi Mining Company (15%), Mokta el Hadid group (15%) and the U.S. Steel (49%). A 220 miles (350 km) railway had first to be built to the coast, so full production was not expected until at least 1960. The Compagnie minière de l'Ogooué (Comilog) had initial capital of CFA 150 million. The first ore was shipped from Moanda on 2 October 1962.

In 1957, Georges Perrineau was appointed a director of the Mokta company and a member of the Executive Committee. In 1962 he became vice-president and, at the end of 1962 replaced Henri Lafond as president of the SACEM subsidiary that exploited the Imini manganese deposits in Morocco. Henri Lafond was assassinated in Paris on 6 March 1963, apparently by an OAS member because he refused to support the OAS with the companies in his group. He was succeeded as head of the Mokta company by Perrineau, who also became head of the Compagnie des Mines de Huaron, in which Mokta had a large stake. Perrineau was president of Mokta until 1970. In 1965 Perrineau presided over the company's centenary celebrations in Côte-d'Ivoire, which were attended by President Félix Houphouët-Boigny.

In 1965. the company took a minority stake in the company formed to exploit chromium ore in Madagascar, directed by Ugine. In July 1967, France and Niger made agreements that included recognition of a uranium mining concession in Niger to be capitalized 45% by the Atomic Energy Commission, 40% by the private French companies Mokta El Hadid and French Uranium-ore, and 15% by the state of Niger. The exploitation company was Somaïr. Also in 1967 the merger activity between Suez and the Banque de l'Union parisienne caused Suez to become a direct shareholder in Mokta, and also in Huaron and Comuf. In 1968 Mokta joined forces with Pechiney to form the Péchiney Mokta mining company, which would manage various uranium operations and fund research activity, particularly in Saskatchewan, Canada.

In October 1970 the Société le Nickel, soon after to become the Imetal holding company, took over the Mokta company through a share swap. Perrineau remained a director and advisor. In 1980 Imetal absorbed Mokta, which was renamed Compagnie française de Mokta (CFM). As of 1991 the Compagnie française de Mokta was a wholly owned subsidiary of COGEMA (Compagnie générale des matières nucléaires), a French company involved in mining and processing uranium.

== Sources ==
- Bennoune, Mahfoud (2002-08-22), The Making of Contemporary Algeria, 1830-1987, Cambridge University Press, ISBN 978-0-521-52432-2
- Bonnichon, Philippe; Gény, Pierre (2012), Présences françaises outre-mer, XVIe-XXIe siècles (in French), KARTHALA Editions, ISBN 978-2-8111-0737-6
- Bouveresse, Jacques (2008), Un parlement colonial: les délégations financières algériennes, 1898-1945 (in French), Publication Univ Rouen Havre, ISBN 978-2-87775-876-5
- Clozier, R. (1950), "Les sociétés milliardaires en France", L'Information Géographique (in French), 14 (2): 69, doi:10.3406/ingeo.1950.5965
- "Compagnie des Minerais de Fer Magnétique De Mokta-el-Hadid" (PDF), Entreprises Coloniales (in French), 5 July 2015
- Davis, Diana K. (2007-09-11), Resurrecting the Granary of Rome: Environmental History and French Colonial Expansion in North Africa, Ohio University Press, ISBN 978-0-8214-1751-5
- Dupont, Maurice (August–September 1952), "Les intérêts français contre l'intérêt de la France en Afrique du Nord", Esprit (in French), 193/194 (8/9), Editions Esprit: 321–352, JSTOR 24253081
- Fournel, Henri (14 May 1848), "Richesses minérales de l'Algérie" (PDF), Le Journal des débats (Séances des 1er et 8 mai) (in French), Académie des sciences – via Les entreprises coloniales françaises p=1/73
- "Georges Charles PERRINEAU (1912-1994)", Annales des Mines (in French)
- Gille, Bertrand (1968), La Sidérurgie française au XIXe siècle: Recherches histioriques (in French), Librairie Droz, ISBN 978-2-600-04046-4
- Gros, Philippe (August 2008), "La COMILOG, une "success story"" (PDF), Réalités Industrielles (in French)
- Holland, R.F.; Porter, A.N. (2012-11-12), Money, Finance, and Empire, 1790-1960, Routledge, ISBN 978-1-136-28427-4
- iminimaroc (10 May 2009), La SACEM : Une performance socio-économique salutaire (in French)
- Iron and Steel Institute (1880), "Africa", The Journal of the Iron and Steel Institute, The Institute
- Joly, Bertrand (1994), Archives Minieres du Groupe Marine-Wendel (PDF) (in French), Archives nationales
- Lespagnol, André (January 1986), "Review: Le problème colonial: Empire colonial et capitalisme français. Histoire d'un divorce by Jacques Marseille", Revue d'histoire de la Deuxième Guerre mondiale et des conflits contemporains (in French), 36e Année (141), Presses Universitaires de France: 114–116, JSTOR 25729328
- Levainville, J. (15 March 1924), "Ressources Minérales de l'Afrique du Nord", Annales de Géographie (in French), 33e Année (182), Armand Colin: 151–166, JSTOR 23439890
- Le "Zembra" (in French), UIM.marine
- May, A. Wilfred (December 1939), "American and European Valuation of Equity Capital: A Comparison", The American Economic Review, 29 (4), American Economic Association: 734–745, JSTOR 1804161
- Meynier, Gilbert (1981), L'Algérie révélée: la guerre de 1914-1918 et le premier quart du XXe siècle (in French), Librairie Droz, ISBN 978-2-600-04098-3
- Mining Journal (1878), "Iron Ore", Dictionary of Arts, Manufactures and Mines
- Passaqui, Jean-Philippe (2013), "Quand l'innovation engendre l'incertitude : réception et diffusion du procédé Martin", Marteau Pilon (in French)
- Pons, R. (1954), "The French Union in 1953", Civilisations, 4 (2), Institut de Sociologie de l'Université de Bruxelles: 285–310, JSTOR 41377627
- Postel, A. Williams (1943), The Mineral Resources of Africa, UPenn Museum of Archaeology, ISBN 978-0-686-24091-4
- Prochaska, David (2002), Making Algeria French: Colonialism in Bône, 1870-1920, Cambridge University Press, ISBN 978-0-521-53128-3
- Rivet, Daniel (October–December 1979), "Mines et politique au Maroc, 1907-1914 (D'après les archives du Quai d'Orsay)", Revue d'histoire moderne et contemporaine, 26 (4), Societe d'Histoire Moderne et Contemporaine: 549–578, doi:10.3406/rhmc.1979.2436, JSTOR 20528550
- Robequain, Charles (January–February 1958), "CHRONIQUE GÉOGRAPHIQUE: Perspectives sur l'Union Française", Annales de Géographie (in French), 67e Année (359), Armand Colin: 78–94, JSTOR 23443647
- Scipion, Philippe (1967), "New developments in French-speaking Africa", Civilisations, 17 (3), Institut de Sociologie de l'Université de Bruxelles: 306–317, JSTOR 41231048
- "Société du Djebel-Djérissa (Tunisie)" (PDF), entreprises-coloniales.fr (in French), 27 June 2015
- Timkkit, Boutazoult Imini (13 April 2008), MOKTA EL HADID 1865 - 1965 (in French)
- Timkkit, Boutazoult Imini (4 May 2008a), ASSASSINAT D'UN PDG DE LA SACEM : MARS 1963 (in French)
- Tomas, François (1977), Annaba et sa région: organisation de l'espace dans l'extrême-Est algérien (in French), Université de Saint-Etienne, ISBN 978-2-9500272-1-4
- Tommasi-Crudeli (1903), "Blue Gum. (Eucalyptus Globulus, Labill.)", Bulletin of Miscellaneous Information (Royal Botanic Gardens, Kew), 1903 (1), Springer on behalf of Royal Botanic Gardens, Kew: 1–10, doi:10.2307/4111387, JSTOR 4111387
- Travers, L. (May–June 1958), "La Mise en Valeur du Lac Fetzara", Annales de Géographie (in French), 67 (361), Armand Colin: 260–262, JSTOR 23443549
- US Geological Survey (1895), Mineral Resources of the United States, U.S. Government Printing Office
- Watson, William E. (2003), Tricolor and Crescent: France and the Islamic World, Greenwood Publishing Group, ISBN 978-0-275-97470-1
- Whiteside, R. M. (2012-12-06), Major Companies of Europe 1991-1992 Vol. 1 : Major Companies of the Continental European Community, Springer Science & Business Media, ISBN 978-94-011-3016-5
