= Charles Lutaud =

French administrator

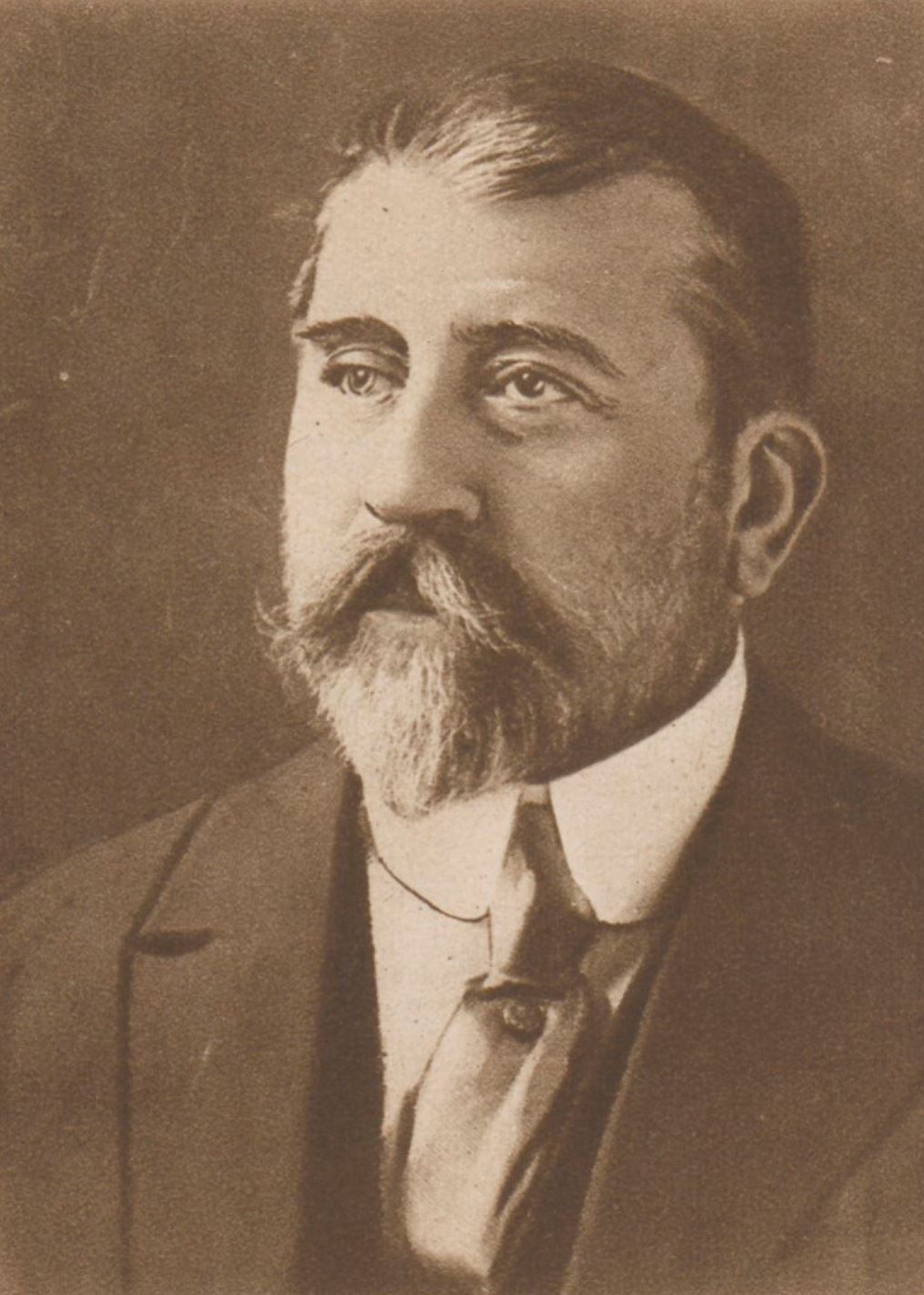

Governor General of Algeria
- In office 22 May 1911 – 29 Jan 1918
- Preceded by: Charles Célestin Jonnart (acting)
- Succeeded by: Charles Célestin Jonnart (acting)

Personal details
- Born: 15 November 1855 Mâcon, France
- Died: 21 October 1921 (aged 65) Paris, France
- Occupation: Civil servant

Charles Lutaud (15 November 1855 – 27 October 1921) was a French administrator who became Governor General of Algeria from 1911 to 1918. He was a supporter of French settlement in the colony. He felt that granting voting rights to the indigenous Muslims of Algeria should only be done gradually, as they advanced to the same level as the French.

== Early career ==
Charles Lutaud was born in Mâcon on 15 November 1855. His parents were François Lutaud, clerk of the justice of the peace, and Marie Corsin. He obtained a degree in law. On 20 December 1877 he was appointed Chief of Staff to the prefect of the Somme department. On 24 March 1879 he was made Chief of Staff to the prefect of Loire-Inférieure. On 25 November 1881 he became Secretary General of the prefecture of Morbihan. He was appointed Deputy Chief of Staff to Pierre Waldeck-Rousseau, Minister of the Interior, on 1 March 1883, and then deputy chief of staff to François Allain-Targé, Minister of the Interior, on 21 March 1883.

On 10 April 1884 Lutaud was appointed sub-prefect of Boulogne. He was appointed prefect of Sarthe on 24 May 1889. In August 1891 the Republicans of Sarthe paid homage to Lutaud. He was made Prefect in turn of Corsica (3 October 1893), Côtes-du-Nord (21 October 1895) and Haute-Garonne (13 July 1897).

Lutaud was appointed Prefect of Algiers in December 1898. The Jews of Algeria had been given French citizenship in 1870. Lutaud took office at a time of antisemitic agitation by the colons. In an interview with L'Écho de Paris after his appointment, he announced that the Algiers police would be reorganized on the Parisian model. Lutaud was a freemason, and soon became the target of antisemitic newspapers in Algeria. On 26 April 1901 rebels attacked the small French settlement of Margueritte, killing six Europeans. The response was violent, with sixteen Muslims killed and 125 charged. The event was used as an excuse for a reactionary campaign to remove Lutaud from office.

Lutaud left Algiers in 1901. He was appointed Prefect of Bouches-du-Rhône (16 July 1901), Gironde (9 September 1902) and then Rhône (4 January 1907). Lutaud married Valentine Loucou in Paris on 28 July 1908.

== Governor-general of Algeria ==
Lutaud was appointed to succeed Charles Jonnart as governor-general of Algeria on 21 March 1911, taking office in May 1911. In Algeria, he did not meet the expectations of the liberals. Among his first declarations he talked of the civilizing mission of France and her representatives in Algeria. He fully supported the European settlers, and allowed them to continue to acquire land. He did not make any reforms that would help the indigenous population.

Lutaud declared that the Algerians were not essentially inferior to the French, but were backward, and the French had a duty to educate them. He used this backwardness as an excuse for discriminatory policies. He said that he had a profound confidence in the unity of the human race, and expected that by progressive steps the Algerians would be able to receive the same rights as the French. The steps would be slow but sure. Their children would eventually receive the same education as the French, and they would eventually receive the franchise. Any resistance by the Algerians to becoming French was just evidence of their backwardness. Once the indigenous people had become French, they would cease to be indigenous.

In 1912 he received requests from the Natural History Society of North Africa and the Horticultural Society of Algiers to create protected parks covering 45,000 hectares (110,000 acres) of forested land in Algeria. Lutaud favoured the idea, and asked the North African Station for Forest Research to prepare a proposal. World War I (1914–1918) put a halt to plans, but after the war an expanded version of the plan was implemented.

Lutaud faced pressure from a coalition of liberal parliamentarians and the growing number of members of the Algerian elite who had received French education to grant full citizenship rights to Algerians. He responded with minimal concessions to avoid making significant changes. By a decree of 18 June 1913 he exempted a very small number of Muslims from the native code, and abolished the requirement for permits to travel within Algeria and between Algeria and France. These and a few other changes became law on 15 July 1914.

During World War I many Muslim Algerians fought for France, causing growing pressure to enfranchise them. In 1915 Lutaud threatened resignation if this happened. (Note: After Lutaud had left office, the Jonnart Law was passed on 4 February 1919. It expanded the Muslim electorate, but retained a system under which European representatives retained control. The measures did not satisfy the Muslims, who felt France had not followed through on her promises, but were too much in the eyes of the European colonists.) In 1917 Lutaud made a proposal to allow all Algerian soldiers to apply for French citizenship, not just those who had fought in Europe. However, the colonial administration would vet their applications, not the Ministry of War. The effect would presumably be fewer approved applications. In a report of December 1917 he pointed out the danger of a proposal for giving citizenship to Algerian soldiers that would have made the ability to read and write Arabic a qualification, since this would encourage the spread of that language.

Georges Clemenceau returned to power for the last time in November 1917, and decided the Algerians should be rewarded for their contribution to the war effort. He replaced Lutaud by Charles Jonnart, who had already served as governor twice. Lutaud left office in January 1918.

== Last years ==
In June 1918 Lutaud was given the authority of a high commissioner of France in the Ukrainian People's Republic, which had made terms with the central powers in February that year with the Treaty of Brest-Litovsk.

Lutaud was appointed an officer of the Legion of Honour on 10 August 1899, Knight on 13 July 1891, Commander on 9 January 1914 and Grand Officer in January 1919. He died in Paris on 27 October 1921. His ashes are in the columbarium of Père Lachaise Cemetery in Paris. He has been called a good representative of conservative Jacobinism. He left the reputation of a zealous, clumsy and brutal administrator, but was strong in his convictions.

== Bibliography ==
- Lutaud, Charles (1914). Rapport de M. Charles Lutaud. Gouverneur Général de l'Algérie sur les travaux préparatoires et expériences éffectués au cours de l'année 1917 en vue de l'évaluation des propriétés non bâties (31 Mars 1914). imp. adm. V. Heinti.
- Lutaud, Charles (1914). Evaluation des propriétés non bâties. Rapport de M. Ch. Lutaud,... sur les opérations effectuées au cours de l'année 1914 (31 mars 1915). V. Heintz.
- Lutaud, Charles (1915). Etude en vue de l'application de l'impôt foncier aux Indigènes en remplacement des impôts arabes. impr. administr. V. Heintz.
- Lutaud, Charles (1916). Exposé de la situation générale de l'Algérie. V. Heintz.
- Lutaud, Charles (1916). Situation générale des Territoires du Sud de l'Algérie pendant les années 1914 et 1915. Impr. A. Jourdan.
- Lutaud, Charles (1917). Les troubles insurrectionnels de l'arondissement de Batna en 1916.
- Lutaud, Charles (1918). Notes sur les forêts de l'Algérie. Impr. A. Jourdan.

== Sources ==
- "Annexes de la série M : administration générales et économie du département (1800-1940)". Gironde Archive départmentales. Conseil Général de la Gironde. Archived from the original on 2016-03-03.
- Castelbajac, Ghislain de; Gasquet, Sébastien de; Soutou, Georges-Heinri (1995-01-01). Recherches sur la France et le problème des Nationalités pendant la Première Guerre mondiale: Pologne, Ukraine, Lithuanie. Presses Paris Sorbonne. ISBN 978-2-84050-053-7.
- Davis, Diana K. (2007-09-11). Resurrecting the Granary of Rome: Environmental History and French Colonial Expansion in North Africa. Ohio University Press. ISBN 978-0-8214-1752-2.
- Fogarty, Richard S. (2008-07-16). Race and War in France: Colonial Subjects in the French Army, 1914–1918. JHU Press. p. 331. ISBN 978-0-8018-8824-3.
- Gavois, Marc-Olivier (2006). "Le tournant de 1899–1902 dans la Maçonnerie en Algérie à travers la loge Le Soleil levant". Cahiers de la Méditerranée. 72.
- Gissibl, Bernhard; Hler, Sabine H.; Kupper, Patrick (2012-01-15). Civilizing Nature: National Parks in Global Historical Perspective. Berghahn Books. ISBN 978-0-85745-525-3.
- Heggoy, Alf Andrew (1982-01-01). Through Foreign Eyes: Western Attitudes Toward North Africa. University Press of America. ISBN 978-0-8191-2182-0.
- Landru, Philippe (10 February 2010). "Le columbarium du Père Lachaise : F à L".
- Meynier, Gilbert (1981). L'Algérie révélée: La guerre de 1914–1918 et le premier quart du XXe siècle. Librairie Droz. p. 31. ISBN 978-2-600-04098-3.
- Revue historique et archéologique du Maine. Imprimerie Monnoyer. 1892. p. 102.
- Rosenberg, Clifford D. (2006). Policing Paris: The Origins of Modern Immigration Control Between the Wars. Cornell University Press. ISBN 978-0-8014-7315-9.
- Ruedy, John Douglas (2005). Modern Algeria: The Origins And Development of a Nation. Indiana University Press. ISBN 978-0-253-21782-0.
- Thénault, Sylvie (2012-01-05). Violence ordinaire dans l'Algérie coloniale: Camps, internements, assignations à résidence. Odile Jacob. p. 53. ISBN 978-2-7381-8203-6.
