= Léon Talabot =

French engineer, iron master and politician (1796–1863)

Joseph Léon Talabot
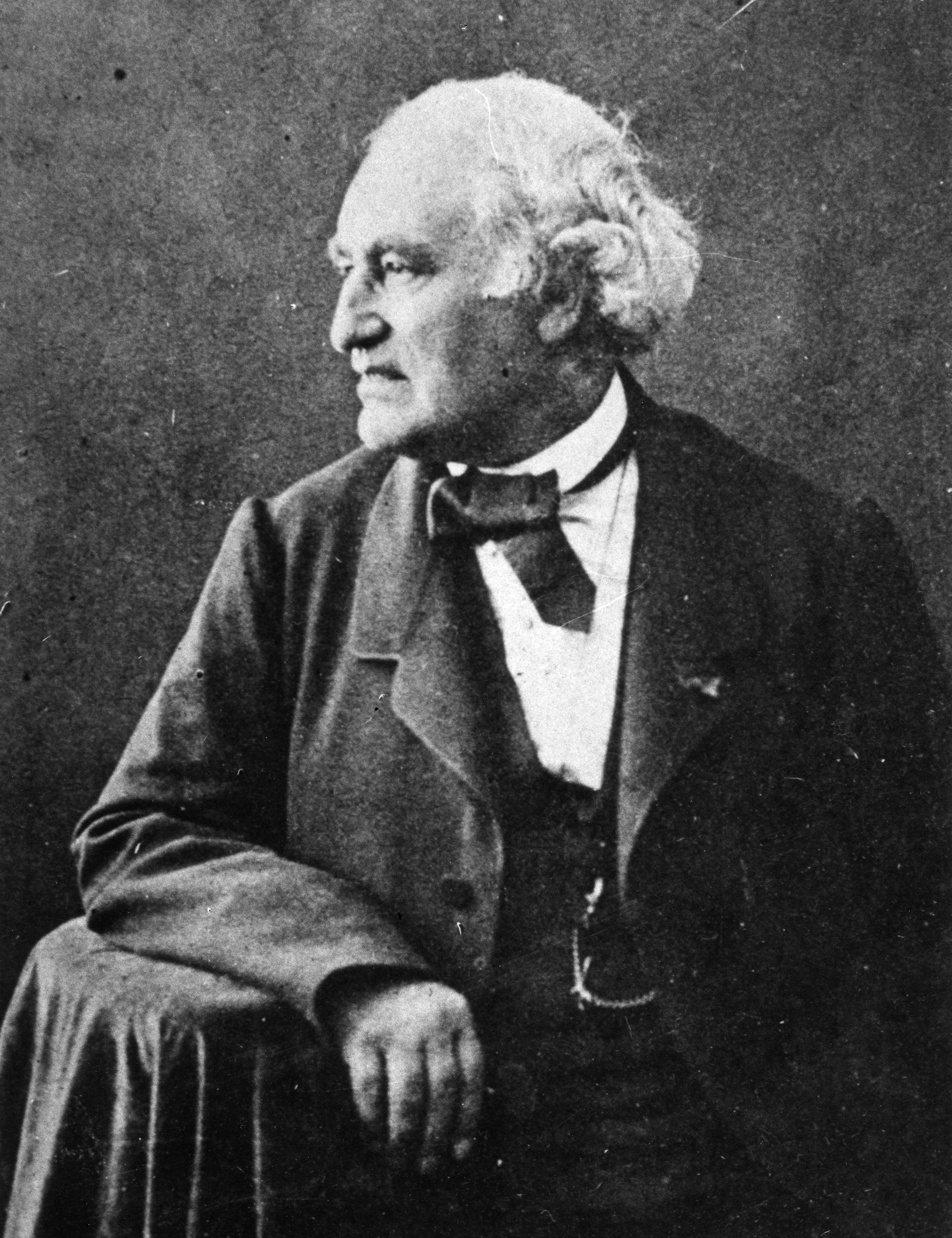
- Léon Talabot

Deputy for Haute-Vienne
- In office 23 January 1836 – 24 February 1848

Personal details
- Born: Joseph Léon Talabot; 5 February 1796 Limoges, Haute-Vienne, France
- Died: 23 September 1863 (aged 67) Soisy-sous-Montmorency, Val-d'Oise, France
- Occupation: Engineer, iron master, politician

Joseph Léon Talabot (French pronunciation: [leɔ̃ talabo]; 5 February 1796 – 23 September 1863) was a French engineer, iron master and politician. He advocated protectionist policies to maintain the prices of iron and steel. He was the founder of the Denain-Anzin steelworks.

== Early years ==
Joseph Léon Talabot was born on 5 February 1796 in Limoges, Haute-Vienne. His father, Francois Talabot (1764–1839), was a lawyer, and his mother was Marie Agathe Martin-Lagrave. He had seven siblings, including the railway and canal engineer Paulin Talabot (1799–1885). He received formal training as an engineer. Talabot operated the joint-stock Saut-du-Tarn steel making company near Albi, Tarn, which had been founded in the 1820s by capitalists from Toulouse. In 1836 Talabot's Forges et Laminoirs d'Anzin was founded to make rails for use by the proposed Northern Railroad. Talabot was the engineer in chief of the Paris-Dijon railway.

== Politician ==
Talabot was elected deputy for Limoges, Haute-Vienne, on 23 January 1836, replacing Pierre-Alpinien Bourdeau, who had resigned. He was reelected on 4 November 1837, 2 March 1839, 9 July 1842 and 1 August 1846. He sat in the center left, among the supports of Adolphe Thiers. In 1842, during the debates over the railway laws, he organized a lobby of deputies from the Center and the Midi. In 1846 the Association pour la défense du Travail national was formed to promote protectionist policies. The council included Antoine Odier (President), Auguste Mimerel (Vice-President), Joseph Périer (Treasurer) and Louis-Martin Lebeuf (Secretary). Members included Henri Barbet, Léon Talabot, Eugène Schneider and Jules Hochet. The Association, and Talabot personally, was opposed to the reform of the customs system advocated by Laurent Cunin-Gridaine. Talabot's political career ended with the French Revolution of 1848.

== Later career ==
In 1849 Talabot merged the Forges et Laminoirs d'Anzin with the nearby Serret, Lelièvre, Dumont et Cie company of Denain to form the Société des hauts-fourneaux et des forges de Denain et Anzin, the largest metallurgical company in the Nord Department. Talabot managed Denain-Anzin after the merger. In 1850 the French iron masters created an Assemblée Générale des Maîtres de Forges de France, under the presidency of Léon Talabot. At the end of the year it took the name of Comité des Maîtres de Forges. In 1855 Talabot assumed the title of president of the Comité des Forges. In 1860 the Inspector-General of Mines, Combes, wrote to the Minister of Commerce that Talabot's Comité des Forges would use whatever threats or arguments they felt likely to be effective in maintaining the price of iron. In 1860 Talabot also became president of a new Association for the Defense of National Labor, which was opposed to lowering of tariffs.

Talabot was made a knight of the Legion of Honour. He died on 23 September 1863 in Soisy-sous-Montmorency, Val-d'Oise. Baron Robert de Nervo married Léon Talabot's daughter Lucie-Agathe (1844–73) on 31 October 1867. The Nervo family would make Denain-Anzin the fifth-largest steel producer in France by 1913.

== Publications ==
- Talabot, Léon (1860), Le Régime douanier en 1860. Fers., Vve J. Renouard

== Sources ==
- Carlisle, Robert B. (Autumn 1968), "Saint-Simonian Radicalism: A Definition and a Direction", French Historical Studies, 5 (4), Duke University Press: 430–445, doi:10.2307/286052, JSTOR 286052
- Dunham, Arthur Louis (February 1927), "The Influence of the Anglo-French Treaty of Commerce of 1860 on the Development of the Iron Industry in France", The Quarterly Journal of Economics, 41 (2), Oxford University Press: 317–337, doi:10.2307/1883504, JSTOR 1883504
- Fohlen, Claude (May 1956), "Bourgeoisie française liberte economique et intervention de l'Etat", Revue économique (in French), 7 (3), Sciences Po University Press: 414–428, doi:10.2307/3497777, JSTOR 3497777
- Gille, Bertrand (1968), La Sidérurgie française au XIXe siècle: Recherches histioriques (in French), Librairie Droz, ISBN 978-2-600-04046-4
- Leclerc, Yvan (2000), Province Paris (in French), Publication Univ Rouen Havre, ISBN 978-2-87775-905-2
- Palmas, Jean Pierre de, "Robert de Nervo", Geneanet (in French)
- "Paulin François TALABOT (1799-1885)", Annales des Mines
- Robert, Adolphe; Cougny, Gaston (1889), "Talabot, Joseph Léon", Dictionnaire des parlementaires français de 1789 à 1889
- Smith, Michael Stephen (2006), The Emergence of Modern Business Enterprise in France, 1800-1930, Harvard University Press, ISBN 978-0-674-01939-3
- The Foreign Quarterly Review, Treuttel, 1847
