= Paulin Talabot =

French railway and canal engineer (1799–1885)

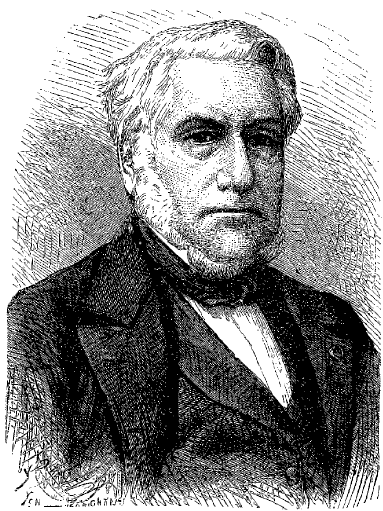
- Born: 18 August 1799; Limoges, France
- Died: 21 March 1885 (aged 85); Paris, France
- Resting place: Condat-sur-Vienne
- Education: École polytechnique
- Occupations: Engineer, politician

François "Paulin" Talabot (French pronunciation: [polɛ̃ talabo]; 18 August 1799 – 21 March 1885), also known as Paulin-François Talabot, was a French railway and canal engineer and politician.

Educated at École polytechnique, Talabot started his career building canals. Inspired by George and Robert Stephenson's steam railways in England, he built a line to transport coal from the mines at La Grand-Combe to the Mediterranean at Nîmes, which opened in 1839. He visited England and became friends with Robert Stephenson, with whom he surveyed a route for a Suez Canal in 1847. The French Revolution of 1848 was followed by a financial crisis, and Talabot formed a company in 1852 to take over the struggling railway between Lyon and the Mediterranean; this merged with the Paris to Lyon Railway in 1857 to become the Chemins de fer de Paris à Lyon et à la Méditerranée (PLM). In 1862 Talabot became its first director general before he died in 1885.

A Bonapartist, he served as a deputy for Gard (1863–1870) and presided over the General Council of Gard (1865–1870), elected in the canton of Nîmes-3 (1858–1870).

The Château Talabot in Marseille, built for him in 1860 by architect Louis-Jules Bouchot, bears his name.

== Biography ==
=== Early life ===
François "Paulin" Talabot was born on 18 August 1799 in Limoges in western France. His father, François Talabot (1764–1839), was a bourgeois lawyer and local judge; his mother was Marie Agathe Martin-Lagrave. He had seven siblings, including four brothers: Pierre Auguste (1790–1867); Joseph Léon (1796–1863); François Jules (1792–1868); and Jean-Baptiste Edmond (1804–1832). He studied at École polytechnique from 1819; Talabot is said to have become a follower of the Saint-Simonianism movement, but according to some sources this is confusing him with his younger brother, Edmond.

=== Career ===
In 1821, he started work building canals in Brest, and then in 1829 he moved to Decize, a coal mining area, to rebuild the canal between Aigues-Mortes and Beaucaire.

Learning of the success of the railways in England that were being built by George and Robert Stephenson, Talabot formed the Compagnie des Mines de la Grand’Combe et des chemins de fer du Gard, which planned to build a railway to take the coal from the mines at La Grand-Combe to the Mediterranean at Nîmes. The railway was approved 20 June 1833, but the scheme failed to raise the necessary funds until the government backed the scheme in 1837. Talabot visited England and befriended Robert Stephenson, who later visited Talabot in France. The first section of line from Nîmes to Beaucaire, opened on 15 July 1839, and a train covered the 28 kilometres (17 mi) in 32 minutes using steam locomotives from Newcastle in England hauling carriages built in France. A second section opened in August 1840 and the line was fully opened in 1841.

Between 1838 and 1840, Talabot surveyed a railway between Avignon and Marseille via the Rhone Valley. Permission was granted in 1843 for the difficult 122-kilometre (76 mi) line that included the 600 miles (970 km) bridge over the Rhone and the 4.638-kilometre (2.882 mi) Nerthe tunnel, longer than anything in England at that time.

In 1846, Talabot became a member of the Société d'Études du Canal de Suez in 1846, and the following year had accompanied Robert Stephenson and Alois Negrelli to look at the feasibility of a Suez canal. The British opposed a canal and other countries could not agree on the route. In 1854 he and two of his brothers were listed as founders of the Suez Canal Company by Ferdinand de Lesseps. In 1855 Talabot published Le Canal des deux mers, d'Alexandrie à Suez; moyens d'exécution. He later built railroads in Algeria, where he was also involved with maritime transportation and mining (with the Compagnie de Mokta el Hadid).

Talabot of the first shareholders in the Crédit Lyonnais, founded by Henri Germain (1824–1905) in 1863.

The French Revolution of 1848 was followed by a financial crisis. In 1847 Talabot developed a 300 Franc bond to finance large railway companies, and using this method in 1852 he merged some of the struggling railways into the Lyon Méditerranée Railway. In 1857 this amalgamated with the Paris-Lyon line to form the Chemins de fer de Paris à Lyon et à la Méditerranée (PLM); this was managed as separate northern and southern sections until 1862, when Talabot became its first Director General. Talabot became a member of parliament the following year. He had been decorated Officer of the Legion of Honour on 30 August 1855, and prompted to Commander on 13 August 1864.

=== Decline and death ===
Talabot ran for election as Representative of Basses-Alpes in the National Assembly by-election of 2 July 1871. He lost to Prosper Allemand, who won 14,212 votes against 7,412 for Talabot and 3,755 for Arthur Picard. A fall fractured his kneecap, and an overdose of the chloroform he used to treat the pain made him blind. He retired from the PLM in 1882, accepting the title of Honorary Director General. Talabot died on 21 March 1885.

== Legacy ==
A bust of Talabot was placed at Nîmes railway station in 1997.
