= Union des industries et métiers de la métallurgie =

French employers' union

The Union des industries et métiers de la métallurgie (Union of Metallurgies Industries or UIMM) is the largest sub-federation of the Mouvement des Entreprises de France (MEDEF), the French largest union of employers.

Its current president is Frédéric Saint-Geours, who was elected 20 December 2007.

== See also ==
- Union of Industrial and Employers' Confederations of Europe (UNICE)
- Mouvement des Entreprises de France (MEDEF)
