= Aubrun =

Aubrun may refer to:

- Émile Aubrun (1881–1967), French aviator
- Jules Aubrun (1881–1959), French engineer
- Tom Aubrun (b. 1995), French Professional Ice hockey goalie

== See also ==
- Sir Garfield St Aubrun Sobers (b. 1936), former cricketer who played for the West Indies between 1954 and 1974
