= David Guéron =

Art Deco glass artist

David Guéron (1892–1950) was an interwar Art Deco glass artist in Paris.

== Early life ==
Guéron was born to Spanish Jewish parents in Edirne. In 1914, he joined the French Foreign Legion, which sent him to fight in the First World War, where he was wounded.

== Glassware production ==
After returning to civilian life, Guéron settled in Compiègne, where Armistice of 11 November 1918 was signed, and founded his Cristalleries De Compiègne glassworks. In Compiègne, he manufactured functional glassware, but the 1925 International Exhibition of Modern Decorative and Industrial Arts prompted him to specialize in luxury glassware. The following year, Cristalleries De Compiègne established a factory on Boulevard Malesherbes and a gallery on Avenue de Paris (both in Paris), and adopted the brand Verrerie d'Art Degué, "Degué" being short for "David Guéron". There Guéron produced mainly Art Deco chandeliers and vases, using a wide range of colors. He also produced paperweights, bowls, perfume bottles, stemware, art-glass lamps and hemispherical ceiling lampshades.

Guéron collaborated fruitfully with Edouard Cazaux and Auguste Labouret. The latter painted Cristalleries De Compiègne's largest ever order: the SS Normandie's wall panels.

=== Decline ===
Guéron had a bitter rivalry with Charles Schneider and hired skilled artists from Schneider's factory. Schneider's Société Anonyme des Verreries sued Cristalleries De Compiègne for imitation. The litigation weakened both companies by the time the case was settled in 1932. Cristalleries De Compiègne was further weakened in 1936 by the general strike and ceased production. At the outbreak of the Second World War, Cristalleries De Compiègne was dissolved and Guéron left France for the United States.

== See also ==
- Auguste Daum
- Lalique
