= Sollac =

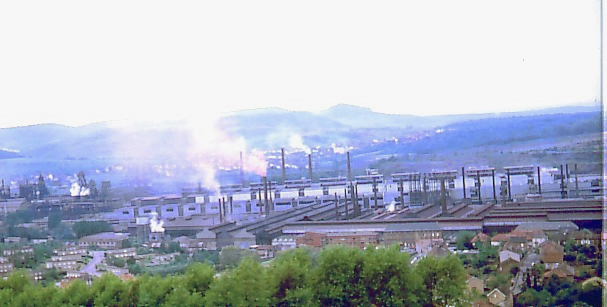
- Hot Rolling Mill, Florange
- Industry: Steel
- Founded: December 1948
- Defunct: 2007
- Fate: Merged into ArcelorMittal
- Headquarters: France

Sollac (Société Lorraine de Laminage Continu) was a French steel company formed in December 1948 as a cooperative. It produced steel rolls in Lorraine from steel supplied by several other companies. The company underwent various changes of ownership in subsequent years.

In 1970, under pressure from the French government, the company began developing a large new continuous strip mill in the south of France.

The French steel industry soon experienced a crisis, marked by excess capacity and declining demand from automobile manufacturers and the construction industry.

Sollac became a subsidiary of Usinor in 1987 and was made responsible for all flat products.

In 2002, Usinor became part of Arcelor, which was then merged into ArcelorMittal in 2006.

== Formation ==
After World War II (1939–45), the United States aimed to ensure that the French steel industry could effectively compete with the Ruhr. Usinor (Union Sidérurgique du Nord de la France) was formed in 1948 through a merger of Denain-Anzin, founded in 1849, and Nord-Est (Forges et Aciéries du Nord-Est). The primary reason for the merger was to implement a continuous rolling mill to reduce costs and meet the anticipated growing market for automobiles and consumer goods. The company utilized technology from United Engineering and Westinghouse Electric International. In 1948, it was agreed that a second strip mill should be established, also using American equipment.

In 1948, Léon Daum promoted the creation of Sollac as a joint-venture flat steel manufacturer. Most of the funding was provided by the state. François Bloch-Lainé, in 1948, justified this on the grounds that Sollac would serve the state's interests. The Société Lorraine de Laminage Continu (Sollac) was established in December 1948. It was created under a cooperative model to build a wide-strip rolling mill in Florange, along with a Thomas and Martin mill and two cold mills. The founding companies maintained their autonomy. Each company supplied its share of cast iron or steel, which Sollac processed into sheet metal, charging at cost price. The founders included:

Share	Company	Notes
47.5%	PFFW (Petits-Fils de François De Wendel)	Lorraine based, de Wendel
47.5%	De Wendel & Cie.	Lorraine based, de Wendel
3.5%	Forges et Aciéries de Gueugnon	de Wendell
3.5%	J.-J. Carnaud et Forges de Basse-Indre	de Wendell
14.5%	Aciéries de Rombas	Lorraine, Mar-Mich-Pont
21%	Forges et Aciéries de Dilling	Saar, Mar-Mich-Pont (soon to become part of Sidélor)
3.5%	UCPMI de Hagondange	
	Marine & Homécourt	
	Aciéries de Longwy	Soon part of LorraineEscaut

The Sollac project was submitted by France to the Organisation of European Economic Cooperation (OEEC) in April 1949, which included representatives from all Marshall Plan countries. When the Belgians refused to approve the project, the Marshall Plan's Economic Cooperation Administration (ECA) recommended that the project be funded regardless. A significant portion of the Marshall Plan counterpart funds from 1949–51 was allocated to Sollac and Usinor. Sollac became the largest single project funded by the Marshall Plan, receiving $49.4 million in direct funds and $83.7 million in counterpart funds. The Americans hoped that with two strip mills, a French monopoly would be less likely to emerge.

== History ==
=== Early expansion (1949–69) ===
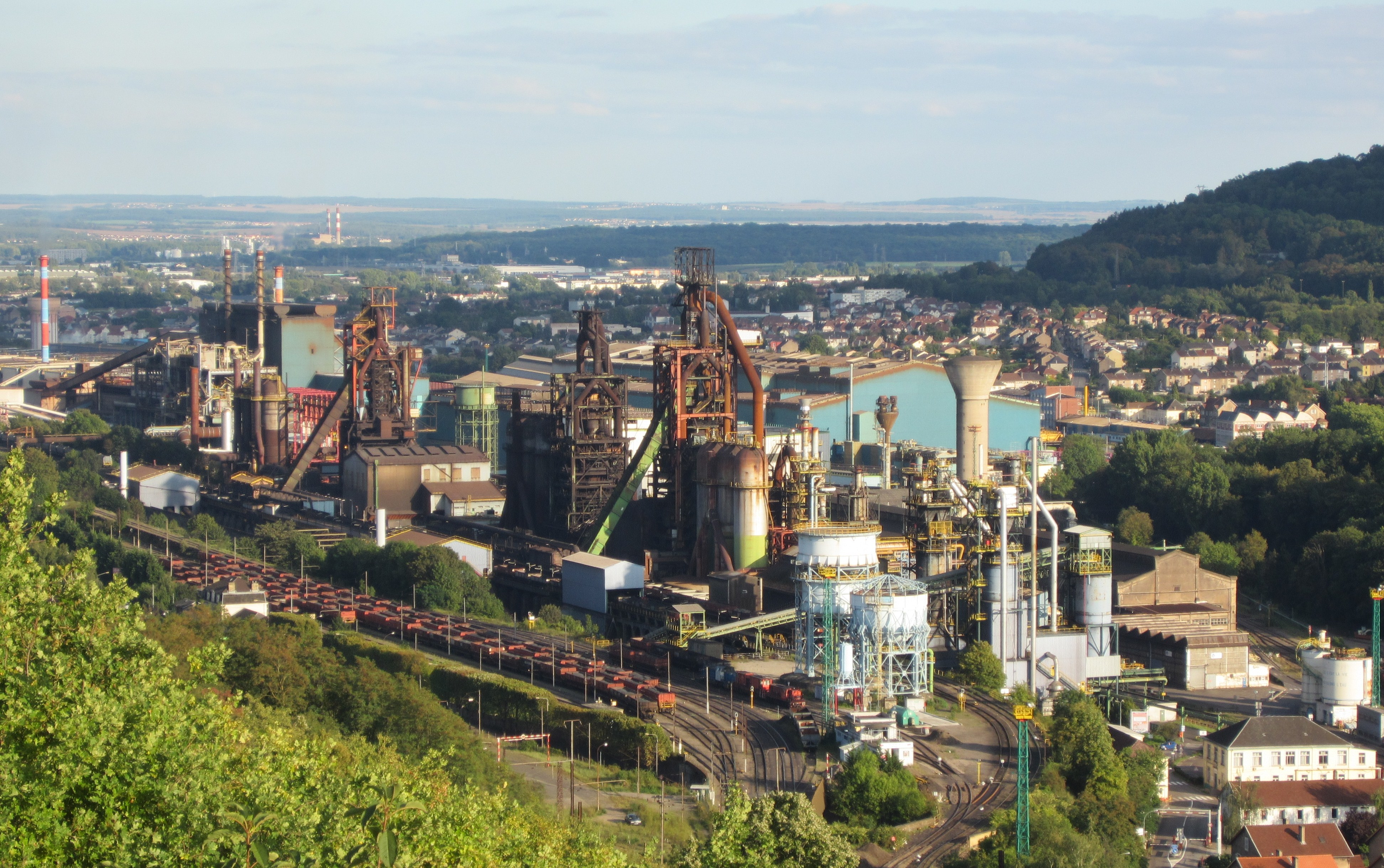
Patural blast furnace at Hayange and Sérémange steelworks

The foundation stone for the Sollac mill was laid on 23 December 1949 in the village of Serémange on the banks of the Fensch river. U.S. Ambassador David K. E. Bruce stated at the groundbreaking ceremony, attended by French Foreign Minister Robert Schuman and Minister of Industry Robert Lacoste, that he hoped the French iron-steel industry would soon be the first in Europe. In 1950, the company formed an association with Continental Foundry and Machines for the manufacture of pilger rolls for continuous mills. The Sollac continuous strip mills at Serémange-Erzange opened in 1954. In September 1954, Jules Aubrun was appointed president of Sollac, replacing Léon Daum, who had been called to serve in the High Authority of the European Coal and Steel Community in Luxembourg.

By 1954, the factories in Serémange alone employed more than 2,000 workers. In 1955, half of Sollac's 3,000 workers were Algerian, recruited by the company due to a shortage of French workers. Crude steel production at Serémange reached 1,411,000 tons by 1959. Serémange had its own oxygen factory, which was expanded in 1959. This was the planned location for the installation of the pure oxygen Kaldo process, with a planned capacity of 500,000 tons. A 160t Kaldo furnace was installed in 1960 at Sollac's Florange steelworks.

In 1951, PFFW and Wendel et Cie merged to form de Wendel SA. Pont-à-Mousson and Marine Firminy formed Sidélor in 1951, consolidating their combined assets in Lorraine. In 1964, Sidélor and Wendel formed the Societé des aciéries de Lorraine. The consortium fully merged in January 1968 to form Wendel-Sidelor. It controlled both Sacilor and Sollac. Sacilor specialized in long products, while Sollac produced flat products. In 1968, a new Sacilor plant was under construction in the Moselle valley at Gandrange, with an expected capacity of 1.6 million tons by 1970. In the late 1960s, Saint-Gobain-Pont-à-Mousson, which owned half of Wendel-Sidélor, decided to withdraw from steelmaking.

=== Solmer (1970–72) ===
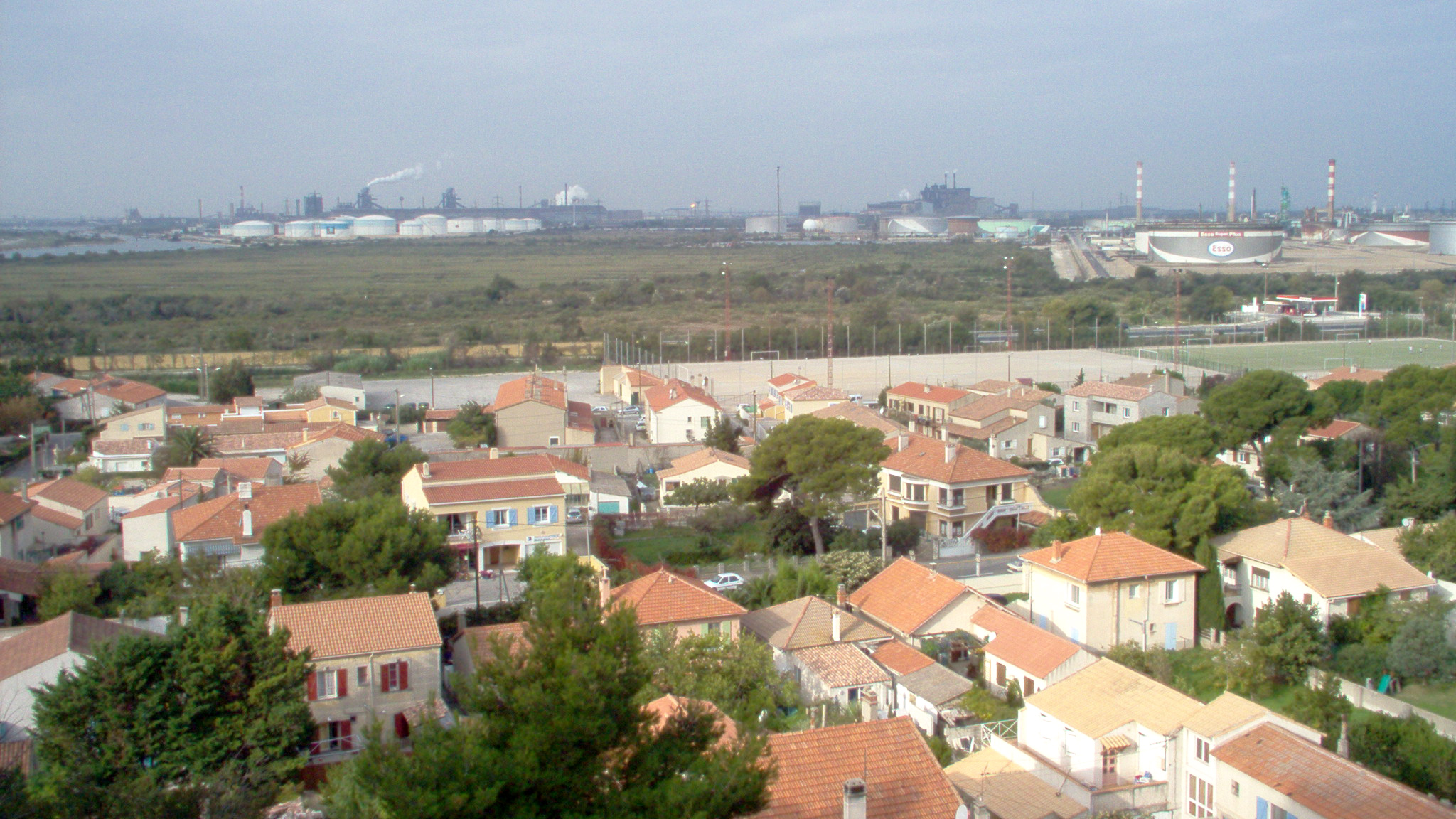
Fos-sur-Mer industrial zone

In the mid-1960s, the French government established a group under Sollac's director general, Louis Dherse, to explore building a second new French steel mill. The government pushed Sollac to build the plant at Fos-sur-Mer in the Rhone's Mediterranean delta. Sollac would have preferred a site near Le Havre, as it would have been closer to larger markets, but the government's regional development plans took precedence. Solmer (Societé Lorraine et Méridionale de Laminage Continu) was formed in November 1970 as a Sollac subsidiary to build and operate the new plant. Sollac was, in turn, a subsidiary of Wendel-Sidélor. Concurrently, Usinor decided to increase the capacity of its Dunkirk plant to 8 million tons per year. Combined with the 4 million tons from Fos-sur-Mer, the two companies would add almost 8 million tons, approximately 45% of the total French output between 1968 and 1973.

By 1971, Wendel-Sidélor was the largest steel producer in France, owning Sacilor, the majority of Sollac, and numerous smaller facilities. However, its productivity was 40% lower than that of Usinor. Great hopes were placed on the Fos-sur-Mer project, but in 1971, Wendel-Sidélor lacked sufficient revenue to finance the project without assistance. In May 1972, Jacques Ferry of the CSSF helped the government persuade the head of Usinor to assist in bailing out the project, despite his strained relationship with the head of Wendel-Sidélor. In October 1972, it was agreed that Ferry would head Solmer, which would be jointly controlled by Usinor and Wendel-Sidélor. Solmer was 47.5% owned by Wendel-Sidélor, 47.5% by Usinor, and 5% by Thyssen.

=== Industry in crisis (1972–86) ===
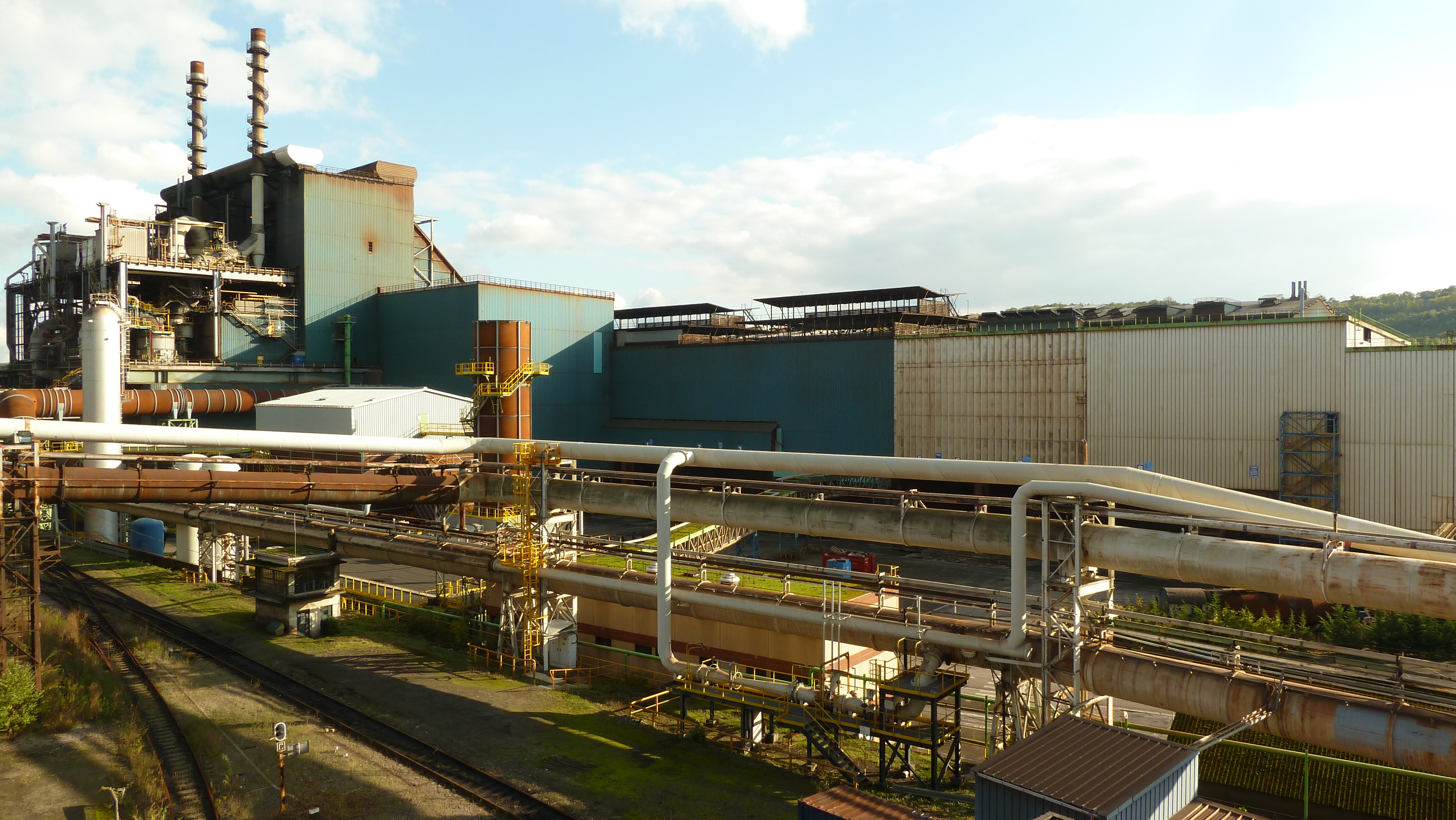
Sérémange steel works in 2012

In 1973, Wendel-Sidélor was renamed Sacilor Aciéries et Laminoires de Lorraine. In 1975, Sacilor merged with Marine Firminy. Jean Gandois became Managing Director of Sollac in 1975. In 1979, he assumed the same position with Rhône-Poulenc. By early 1978, the French steel industry was in crisis, facing excess capacity and low prices. Following a delay due to the March 1978 elections, the cabinet released details of their rescue plan on 20 September 1978. The government converted a portion of the accumulated losses, approximately $8,000 million, into state equity shareholding and covered the remaining losses with loans and guarantees. In effect, the companies had been nationalized. Usinor shares were devalued by 33%, and Sacilor's by 50%. The unions immediately called for a 24-hour stoppage at the Sacilor-Sollac plants throughout Lorraine on 25 September 1978, but they had limited ability to prevent layoffs.

As of January 1981, Sollac's Moselle holdings included a cold rolling operation at Ebange-Florange in the Moselle Valley and a coke works and continuous casting plant at Sérémange in the Fensch Valley. That year, Jacques Mayoux, Managing Director of Sacilor-Sollac, stated that steel production in Europe would be limited for some time, necessitating annual worker reductions to maintain stable production. Sacilor-Sollac acquired SNAP, a specialty steel producer. The Thomas steel plant at Hagandange was closed, and Sollac obtained new oxygen furnaces and two continuous casters. Between 1985 and 1988, Sollac reduced its input costs by 20%.

=== Usinor subsidiary (1986–2002) ===
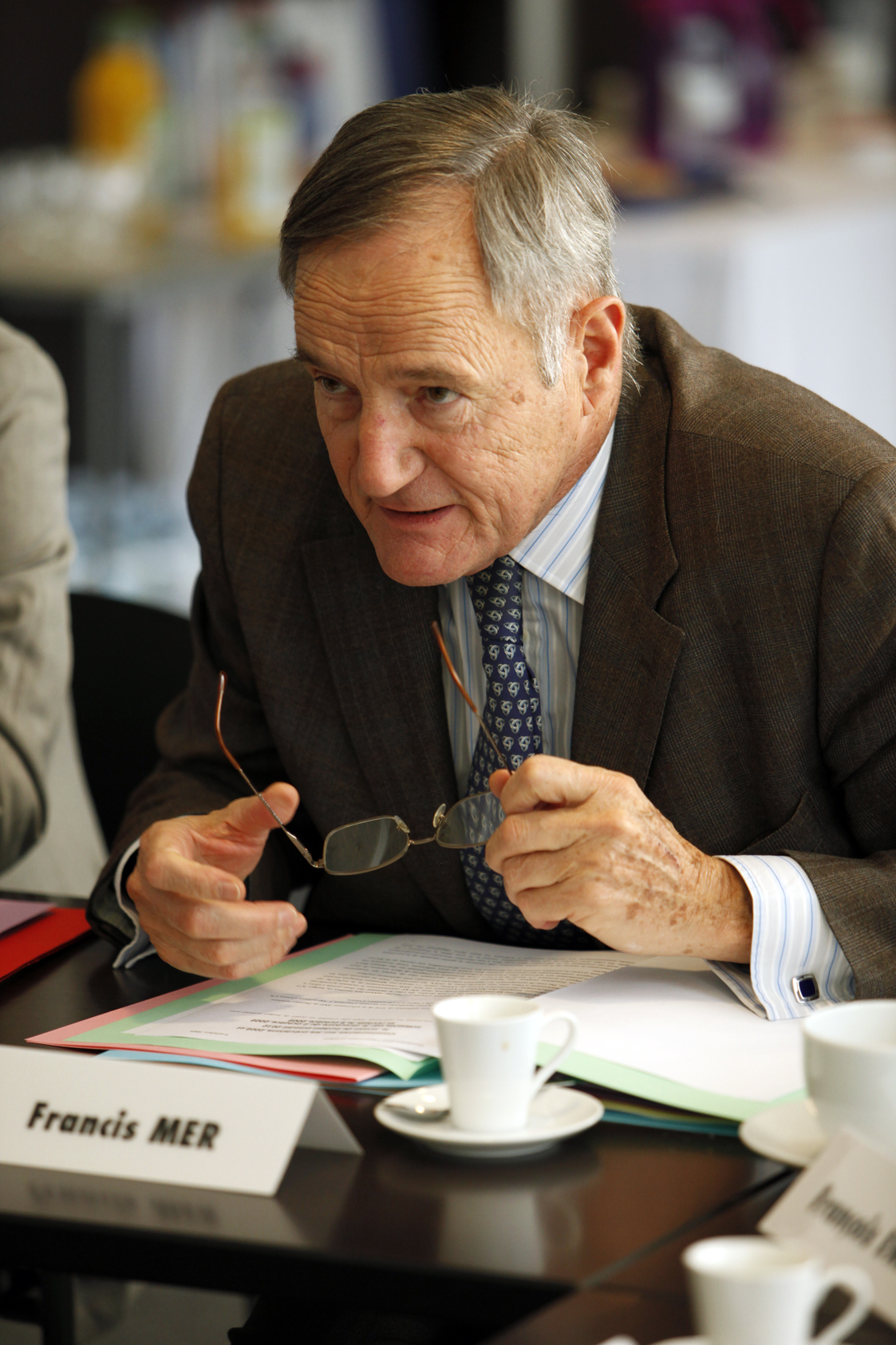
Francis Mer, head of the new Usinor

In 1986, Usinor and Sacilor were combined under a single holding company headed by Francis Mer. The group accounted for 95% of French steel production. The Usinor-Sacilor group underwent an internal reorganization in 1987 into four specialized divisions: Sollac for thin flat products, Ugine for special flat and stainless steel products, Unimetal for long products, and Ascometal for special long products. The new Sollac, the group's largest subsidiary, encompassed the flat products operations of the formerly competing Usinor and Sollac companies. In 1988, the company began basing profit sharing on productivity improvements, with the share calculated separately at each location.

In January 1993, Sollac decided to increase its prices to offset declining volumes. As of 2000, the Sollac steel plant just outside Dunkirk was among the largest and most efficient in Europe. It converted iron ore and coal into steel rolls through a continuous process, producing 6 million tonnes annually. The plant had a dedicated port, railway, and 55 kilometres (34 mi) road network. However, Sollac was struggling due to declining demand from the automobile and construction industries in Europe, resulting in falling prices and excess steel accumulation.

On 1 February 2000, Usinor was restructured geographically. Sollac-Atlantique, Sollac-Lorraine, and Sollac-Méditerranée became fully independent subsidiaries. Sollac-Méditerranée included the French plants at Fos-sur-Mer and Saint-Chély-d'Apcher, as well as plants in Spain, Italy, Turkey, and Portugal. In February 2002, Usinor merged with Arbed (Luxembourg) and Aceralia (Spain) to form Arcelor. In 2006, Arcelor merged with Mittal Steel to form ArcelorMittal. Sollac Atlantique was terminated on 22 January 2007. As of 2008, the subsidiaries were named Société Arcelor Atlantique et Lorraine and Sollac Méditerrannée. The companies were engaged in a dispute with the French government over the greenhouse gas emission allowance trading scheme, which applied different treatment to the steel sector compared to the chemical and non-ferrous metal sectors.

Sollac Mediterranee was later renamed ArcelorMittal Mediterranee SASU. In 2017, ArcelorMittal Atlantique et Lorraine included the main plant at Dunkirk, with a capacity of 7 million tonnes of steel slab and 4.45 million tonnes of hot-rolled coils per year. It also supplied steel slabs to the second hot rolling mill of the unit, located in Sérémange in Lorraine. The unit also included plants at Florange, Base-Indre, Desvres, Mardyck, Montataire, and Mouzon. In 2012, 49% of the unit's output was delivered to the automobile sector.

== Sources ==
- ArcelorMittal Mediterranee SASU (Company Overview), Bloomberg
- Aron, Aexis (February 1960), "Jules AUBRUN", La Jaune et la Rouge (in French)
- Atlantique et Lorraine (in French), ArcelorMittal
- Bamford, Colin Grahame; Munday, Stephen C. R. (2002), Markets, Heinemann, ISBN 978-0-435-33223-5
- Barjot, Dominique (2002), Catching Up with America: Productivity Missions and the Diffusion of American Economic and Technological Influence After the Second World War (Proceedings of the Caen Preconference 18–20 September 1997, Workshop C 45 of Twelfth International Economic History Congress of Madrid), Presses Paris Sorbonne, ISBN 978-2-84050-240-1
- Bonin, Hubert; Goey, Ferry de (2009), American Firms in Europe: Strategy, Identity, Perception and Performance (1880-1980), Librairie Droz, ISBN 978-2-600-01259-1
- Daley, Anthony (1996-02-15), Steel, State, and Labor: Mobilization and Adjustment in France, University of Pittsburgh Pre, ISBN 978-0-8229-7485-7
- EUR-Lex - 62007CA0127 - EN, EUR-Lex
- Freyssenet, Michel (1979), La sidérurgie française, 1945-1979. : L’histoire d’une faillite. Les solutions qui s’affrontent (PDF) (in French), Savelli
- Goddard, Victoria; Narotzky, Susana (2015-01-30), Industry and Work in Contemporary Capitalism: Global Models, Local Lives?, Routledge, ISBN 978-1-317-74521-1
- Godelier, Éric (Summer 2008), "La naissance d'un géant : Arcelor-Mittal (1948-2006)", French Politics, Culture & Society (in French), 26 (2), Berghahn Books, JSTOR 42843551
- J.M. (August–September 1966), "IN MEMORIAM 21 mars 1887 - 28 mai 1966", La Jaune et la Rouge (in French)
- James, Harold (2006), FAMILY CAPITALISM, Harvard University Press, ISBN 978-0-674-02181-5
- Kipping, Matthias (Fall 1994), "Competing for Dollars and Technology: The United States and the Modernization of the French and German Steel Industries after World War II", Papers presented at the fortieth annual meeting of the Business History Conference, Business and Economic History, vol. 23, no. 1, Cambridge University Press, JSTOR 23702848
- Lhaik, Corinne (23 May 1996), "Jean Gandois, un PDG sans langue de bois", L'Express (in French)
- Martin, J. E. (July 1961), "DEVELOPMENTS IN THE LORRAINE IRON AND STEEL INDUSTRY", Geography, 46 (3), Geographical Association, JSTOR 40565267
- Martin, J. E. (November 1968), "New Trends in the Lorraine Iron Region", Geography, 53 (4), Geographical Association, JSTOR 40566963
- Mény, Yves; Wright, Vincent; Rhodes, Martin (1987), The Politics of Steel: Western Europe and the Steel Industry in the Crisis Years (1974-1984), Walter de Gruyter, ISBN 978-3-11-010517-9
- Mioche, Philippe (April–June 1994), "La sidérurgie Française de 1973 à nos jours: Dégénérescence et transformation", Vingtième Siècle. Revue d'histoire (in French) (42), Sciences Po University Press, doi:10.2307/3771210, JSTOR 3771210
- "Modernisation en vue pour Sollac", L'UsineNouvelle (in French)
- Our History, ArcelorMittal
- Price, Victoria Curzon (1981-11-26), Industrial Policies in the European Community, Palgrave Macmillan UK, ISBN 978-1-349-16640-4
- "Sollac Atlantique", Societe SAS (in French)
- Une Ville ... Une histoire (in French), Ville de Serémange-Erzange
