= Henry Küss =

French mining engineer

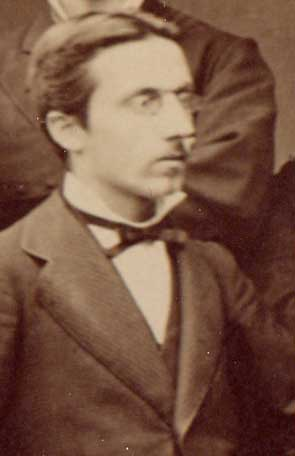
- Henry Küss at the École des Mines de Paris c. 1875
- Born: 19 June 1852; Cernay, Haut-Rhin, France
- Died: 22 November 1914 (aged 62); Neuilly-sur-Seine, Hauts-de-Seine, France
- Occupation: Mining engineer

Henry Küss (or Henry Kuss, (Note: Although Küss is the correct original legal name, the family tended to drop the tréma after 1871 in order not to look too German. As the Légion d'Honneur files show, Henry Kuss himself wrote his name and signed without the trema.) sometimes Henri Küss, 19 June 1852 – 22 November 1914) was a French mining engineer. After brilliant studies at the École Polytechnique and École des Mines he was placed in charge of the mineralogical sub-district around Grenoble. While holding this position, he made overseas trips to Uruguay, Mozambique, Argentina, Peru, Bolivia, Spain, Tunisia and Australia (twice) to assess the potential of mining concessions, earning a high reputation among financiers. He was appointed an inspector-general of mines, and made important contributions to mining education and mine safety and hygiene regulations.

== Early years ==
Henry Küss was born in Cernay, Haut-Rhin, on 19 June 1852. He came from an old Alsace family. His father was Jean-Frédéric Küss (1805–62), a pastor, and his grandfather was Georges Charles Küss, an inspector of records at Colmar and Wissembourg. An uncle and a cousin belonged to the Corps des ponts et chaussées, and another cousin became mayor of Strasbourg. His father had three sons by his first marriage, and ten children by his second marriage, to Louise Amélie Küss (his mother had the same maiden name). Henri was the oldest boy of the second marriage.

When his father died his mother moved with her six living children to Strasbourg, where Henry was admitted to the Lycée de Strasbourg. He was preparing for admission to the École Polytechnique when the Franco-Prussian War broke out on 15 July 1870, preventing all movement. After the war he went to Paris in March 1871 and studied briefly at the Collège Sainte-Barbe before being admitted to the École Polytechnique in the promotion of 1871. After graduating, in 1873 he entered the École des Mines de Paris. As part of his studies, he travelled in the summers of 1874–76 through the coalfields of northern France, Belgium, the Ruhr and Saxony, then the metallic regions of Germany and Austria, and finally the mines of Spain, the lead and zinc mines of Algeria, and the iron mines of the Société Mokta El Hadid. In 1877 Küss graduated with brilliant results. He became a member of the Corps des mines. His memoir on the mercury mines and factories of Almadén in Spain was published in 1878.

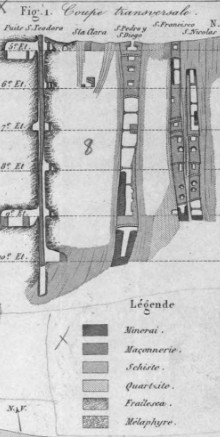
Illustration from Henry Küss's Mémoire sur les mines et usines d'Almaden (1878)

== Mining engineer ==
=== Grenoble ===
Henry Küss was appointed a 3rd class engineer in 1877, and for a year was attached to the Secretariat of the General Council of Mines, and also was entrusted with a district of the Chemins de fer de l'Est (Eastern Railways) under the supervision of one of his uncles, Adolphe Küss, chief engineer of Ponts et Chaussées. On 14 June 1878 he was sent to Grenoble to work for the mineralogical sub-district and control the Chemins de fer de Paris à Lyon et à la Méditerranée. He held these two positions for twelve years. He also went on several mineral and mining explorations in the Alps. During his tenure the anthracite mines of La Mure gradually increased their output from 100,000 tons per year in 1877 to almost 150,000 tons in 1890, when he left the mining region.

=== Overseas voyages ===
While at Grenoble Küss made a series of trips to evaluate mining concessions abroad. From the end of December 1879 to the start of March 1880 Küss visited Uruguay to evaluate a gold concession near what would become Minas de Corrales on the Arroyo Corrales. From May to December 1881 he was attached to a Portuguese mineral exploration mission in the Zambezi region, where he investigated possible gold deposits around the settlement of Tete. At the end of 1882 he explored the Atajo gold mines in Catamarca Province, Argentina. In August 1885 Küss travelled to Panama, which he crossed by railway since the canal was not yet open. He observed in a letter to his family,

The first thing I saw, was a pair of posters with black borders, announcing the death of two Division Engineers, Petit and Sordoillet. Having left France together, on October 8, both had died on November 24. This is a frightening waste of men. ... In the central section – Culebra Hill – where the Company is committed to extract 750,000 cubic meters a month, it hardly reaches 30 to 40,000. The Company's reports have no credibility. It is feared that the Company would not be able to finish the work. Americans are waiting for the Company's agony and ready to give it the final blow. We would have acted as cat's paws for them.

Küss went on via Lima to Tacna, where he evaluated a copper mine, then up to the Bolivian plateau, where he inspected a silver mine. The owners of both mines wanted a professional opinion before investing further. He returned via Panama in December 1885. In 1887 Küss returned to Almaden to check the results of a trial for a new way of processing the mercury slags.

In 1888 Küss married Cécile Jeanne Weiss, daughter of a Registry official from Alsace whom he had met in Grenoble. He had earned a high reputation among financiers and mining engineers, and was much in demand to review other potential mining projects, but now turned down all requests apart than one trip to Tunisia and two to Australia, on each of which he was accompanied by his wife. Küss visited Tunisia in 1892 at the request of the Compagnie des chemins de fer Bône-Guelma to evaluate lead and zinc deposits in the Medjerda valley. He spent July–October 1899 on a visit to Australia, where he surveyed minerals in Coolgardie and the Kalgoorlie district. Many years later, in 1910, he returned to the same region of Australia to check the gold reserves, which appeared to be diminishing. The results of his meticulous examination were recorded in an authoritative report.

=== Later appointments ===
In the fall of 1890 the post of ordinary engineer of the western mineralogical sub-district of the Saint-Étienne coal basin became vacant. The region had suffered a series of disasters at the Châtelus (1887), Verpilleux (1889) and Villeboeuf (1890) mines. The Minister of Public Works wanted an engineer who could reassure the mine workers and force the operators to improve safety measures. In a six month period from October 1890 Küss enforced effective measures to prevent explosion of firedamp in the operations of the Roche-la-Molière et Firminy, Montrambert et La Béraudière, and Mines de la Loire companies. These were later codified by the Administration as general regulations. On 11 May 1891 Küss was appointed chief engineer of the Rodez mineralogical district. On 11 July 1891 he was made a knight of the Legion of Honour.

On 10 February 1892 Küss was entrusted with the Douai mineralogical district, including the mines of the Valenciennes basin, the industrial center of Lille and the École des Mines de Douai, a post he held until 1906. He had to deal with many issues concerning safe operation of mines, while also building up the mining school into an efficient training institute for professional miners. To reassure critics who denounced training of civil servants and thought over-rapid improvement in the social status of workers would be dangerous, in 1905 Henry Küss stated that the pupils did "not need a very extensive scientific background, which they would anyway with very few exceptions be unable to assimilate. On 1 August 1906 Küss was appointed Inspector General 2nd class in charge of the Southeast division. In 1907 he was assigned to the Center division, including the École des Mines de Saint-Étienne. In 1909 he was assigned to the Northwest division, with its great coal basins of Nord and Pas-de-Calais.

On 1 December 1911 Küss was made Inspector General 1st class. He was fluent in English, German and Spanish, and was well-qualified to represent the Ministry of Public Works in international conferences. In 1905 he participated in the Congress of Mining, Metallurgy, Mechanics and Applied Geology. In June 1910 he led the French delegation to the Congress of Mines and Metallurgy in Düsseldorf. In August 1910 he visited the Brussels Exhibition and the Belgian Coal Basins to study facilities for hygiene of mining workers. In September 1913 he participated in the mines section of the International Congress for the Rescue and Prevention of Accidents in Vienna. At the time of his death in 1914 he was Chairman of the Inter-ministerial Commission for Air Navigation and Member of the Central Commission of Steam Engines, the Commission on Mine Hygiene, the Commission for Scientific Research on Firedamp and Explosives, the Advisory Committee on Railways and the Standing Committee on Mines, Hydromineral and climatic stations. For several years he was Technical Commissioner for the Military Commission on Mines.

== Other activities ==
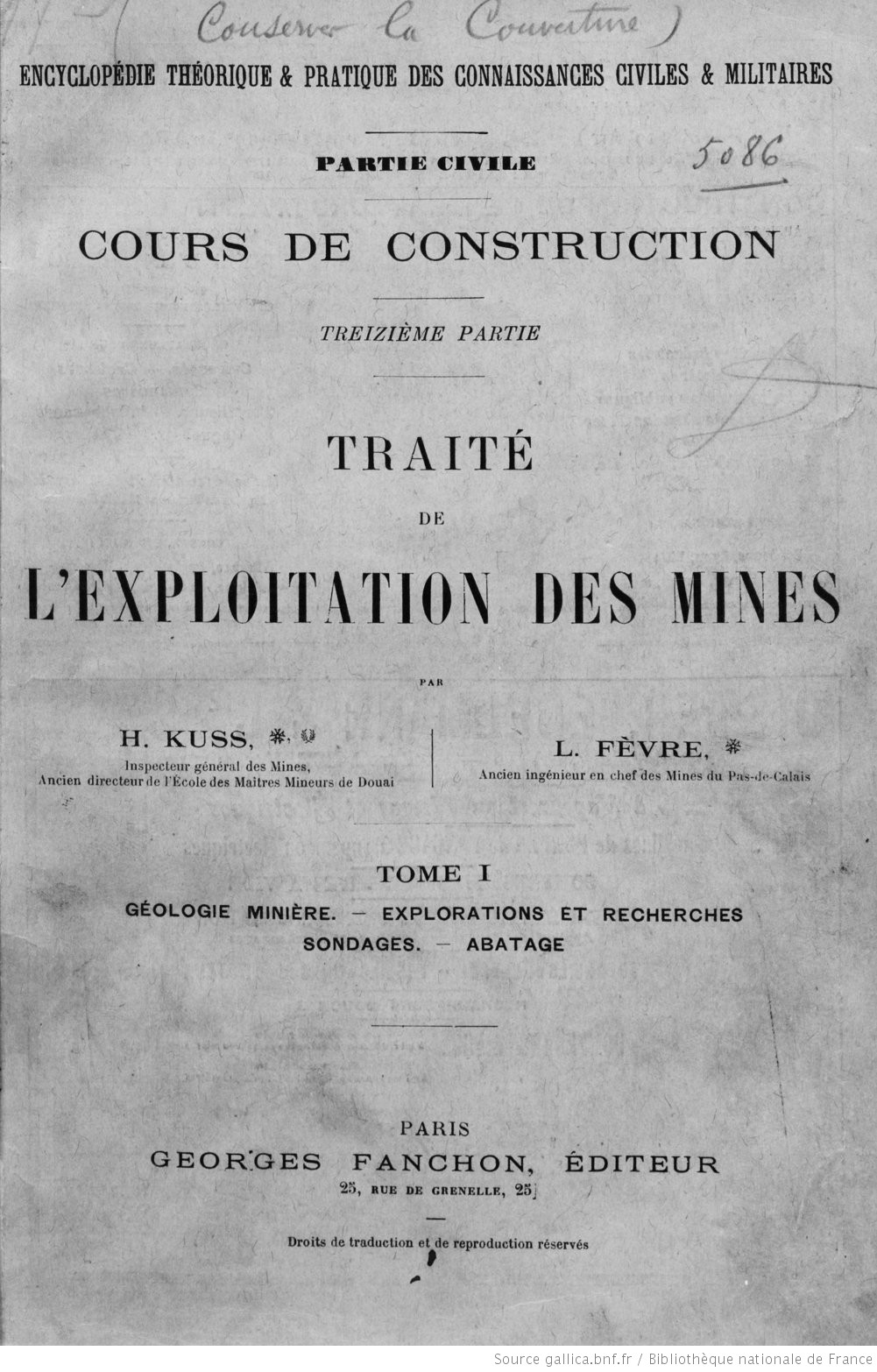
Cover of the third part of the unfinished treatise on exploitation of mines (1908)

The editors of the Encyclopédie théorique et pratique des connaissances civiles et militaires wanted to add a treatise on exploitation of mines. Henry Küss collaborated with Lucien François Fèvre (1862–1935) on this work, whose first instalment was published in July 1897. It was to have 15 major chapters, but was incomplete at the time of Küss's death in 1914. In fact, he was only able to write the 100-page section on mining geology at the start of the work. Jules Aubrun was made an administrator for the mines in the Arras Mineralogical District in the aftermath of the Courrières mine disaster of 10 March 1906. He came to the attention of Henri Küss and Lucien François Fèvre (1862–1935), and worked with them on their work on exploitation of mines.

At the time of the separation of church and state, Küss helped prepare the statutes and regulations of the northeast regional synod of Protestant churches, and was then asked to represent this group in the National Union of Reformed Evangelical Churches. On 20 February 1914 Küss was appointed head of the École nationale supérieure des mines de Paris in succession to Frédéric Delafond, scheduled to start in August. Due to the outbreak of World War I (1914–18) and his declining health he was unable to take up the position. He was struck by illness in June 1914, and submitted to surgery. From now on he was bed-ridden, attended by his wife and daughter. Henry Küss died on 22 November 1914.

== Publications ==
- Henry Küss (1878), Mémoire sur les mines et usines d'Almaden, Dunod
- Henry Küss (May–June 1879), "Note additionnelle sur la métallurgie du mercure à Almaden", Annales des mines, Paris: Dunod
- Henri Kuss (1881), Itinéraire [d'un voyage dans le Mozambique et le Zambèze, de Quélimane à Tete (map), drawn by H. Kuss
- Groddeck, Albrecht von (1884), Traité des gîtes métallifères, translated from the German by Henry Küss, Paris: Dunod
- Henri Kuss (January 1901), "L'Industrie minière de l'Australie occidentale", Annales des mines, Paris: Vve C. Dunod
- Henri Kuss (May 1903), "Note sur les principaux appareils destinés à prévenir l'envoi des cages aux molettes et leurs chocs contre les taquets du fond", Annales des mines, Paris: Vve C. Dunod
- Henri Kuss (June 1903), "Note sur l'explosion d'un récipient de vapeur, le 21 octobre 1902, dans la distillerie de MM. Delaune et Cie, à Seclin (Nord)", Annales des mines, Paris: Vve C. Dunod
- Henri Kuss (1908), Traité de l'exploitation des mines, Paris: G. Fanchon, DL
- Henri Kuss (1911), Note sur la lutte contre l'ankylostomiase dans les mines de houille belges, Paris
- Henri Kuss (January 1911), "Note sur la lutte contre l'ankylostomiase dans les mines de houille belges", Annales des mines, Paris: H. Dunod et E. Pinat
- Henri Kuss (January 1911), "Note sur les installations des bains-douches pour les ouvriers mineurs, en Belgique", Annales des mines, Paris: H. Dunod et E. Pinat

== Sources ==
- Aron, Aexis (February 1960), "Jules AUBRUN", La Jaune et la Rouge (in French)
- Henri KUSS (1852–1914) (in French), Annales des Mines
- Lallemand, Ch. (1922), "Notice Necrologique Sur Henri Kuss : Inspecteur Général Des Mines, Directeur De L'école Nationale Supérieure Des Mines", Annales des Mines, II
- Lembré, Stéphane (September 2013), "L'enseignement professionnel pour l'exemple? Économie minière et besoins de formation aux origines de l'École des maîtres mineurs de Douai (1860–1914)", Histoire, Économie et Société, 32 (3: Morales de la Consommation et Moralisation des Consommateurs), Armand Colin: 87–100, doi:10.3917/hes.133.0087, JSTOR 23614450
- Loizillon, Gabriel J. (2013), The Bunau-Varilla Brothers and the Panama Canal, Lulu.com, ISBN 978-1-300-55840-8
- mdomkirchner, Cécile Jeanne WEISS (in French)
