= Jules Aubrun =

French engineer

Jules Antoine Marie Philippe Aubrun
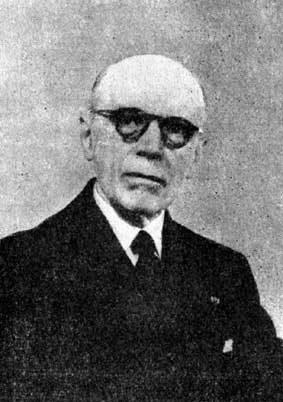
- Born: 23 October 1881; Montluçon, Allier, France
- Died: 8 February 1959 (aged 77); Paris, France
- Occupations: Engineer, financier, company president.

Jules Antoine Marie Philippe Aubrun (23 October 1881 – 8 February 1959) was a French engineer. He served as an executive in various mining and steel making companies, and helped coordinate the iron and steel industry in France before, during and after World War II (1939–45).

== Early years ==
Jules Antoine Marie Philippe Aubrun was born on 23 October 1881 in Montluçon, Allier. His parents were Philippe Aubrun (d. 1929), an inspector of primary education, and Marie Louise Momiron. He studied at the Collège de Boulogne-sur-Mer, then completed his studies at the Lycée Louis-le-Grand in Paris. In 1900 he was accepted by both the École Normale Supérieure and the École Polytechnique, and chose the latter. He graduated in 1902. In 1903 he married Emma Vidor (1882–1970), daughter of Auguste Vidor (1857–1913). His father-in-law was a shipowner of Boulogne-sur-Mer and administrator of the Bank of France.

Aubrun studied at the École des Mines de Paris and became a member of the Corps des mines. He worked as an administrator for the mines in the Arras Mineralogical District in the aftermath of the Courrières mine disaster of 10 March 1906. He came to the attention of two prominent masters of mining techniques, Henry Küss (1852–1914) and Lucien François Fèvre (1862–1935), and worked with them to update their work on exploitation of mines. In 1913 he joined the Société des Forges et Aciéries du Donetz, and from then on was primarily concerned with the iron and steel industry.

At the start of World War I (1914–18) Aubrun was mobilized as a captain of artillery. He fought on the Yser front. As the war dragged on the country faced huge armaments problems, with all efforts concentrated in the Creusot, Loire and Midi regions. Aubrun was assigned to the Poudrerie nationale de Vonges in 1915. In 1916 he was moved to the manufacturing control department at the Schneider-Creusot, where he remained until the end of hostilities.

== Inter-war period ==
The General Directorate of Schneider-Creusot offered Aubrun employment as managing director on demobilization. He spent two years at the head of the Department of Mines at the General Secretariat, then was promoted to the Directorate General on 1 January 1921, vacated by the death of Fournier. He also held many directorships in Creusot subsidiaries in France and abroad including iron mines, pipe foundries, heavy and fine steel, shipyards and electrical construction. In 1929 his friend Frantzen, a former chief engineer of Mines and consulting engineer at Banque Lazard Frères, left the bank for Citroën. Aubrun was offered the job, which he performed for ten years, in effect as a partner at the bank.

Aubrun continued to be involved at the highest levels in the iron and steel industry, which was in great difficulties in France and other countries of Europe. This led to the International Steel Agreement, and national agreements in each country. In France the industry was organized under the Comptoir Sidérurgique de France. The Comptoir implemented an arbitration procedure where a three-member panel forced resolution of disagreements between members, balancing the rights and obligations of each member with the interests of consumers. Aubrun was a member of the first panel, from 1932 to 1935.

== World War II ==
Under the Vichy regime the Comité des forges, the steel makers association, was dissolved by decree on 9 November 1940. It was replaced by the Comité d'organisation de la sidérurgie (CORSID – Organizing Committee for the Iron and Steel Industry). Jules Aubrun was appointed president of committee. Aubrun and the other CORSID members now coordinated the steel industry. The significant change was to pass control from the presidents of the largest steelworks to senior managers of second-ranked steelworks. The committee had the task of organizing the wartime steel industry, covering issues such as collecting statistics, setting prices, overseeing manufacturing programs, distributing raw materials, managing labor and regulating competition. It also had the difficult task of dealing with the German occupying authorities, who constantly demanded output from the French industry.

== Later career ==
The French Steel Makers' Association (Chambre syndicale de la Sidérurgie) was reconstituted in December 1944 and Aubrun was appointed president. He played a leading role in organising the post-war reconstruction of the industry. Aubrun was made a commander of the Legion of Honour on 10 July 1947. He expressed strong concerns to Jean Monnet about whether Robert Schuman's plan for integration of the European coal and steel industry would meet the needs of the French steel makers. With his health failing, he made Pierre Ricard his deputy in 1952, and next year Ricard succeeded him as president of the chamber, while he retained the title of honorary president. Possibly Aubrun's opposition to the Schuman Plan hastened his departure.

In September 1954 Aubrun was asked by the flat steel products company Sollac (Société Lorraine de Laminage Continu) to assume the post of president, replacing Léon Daum, who had been called to serve in the High Authority of the European Coal and Steel Community in Luxembourg. He was also vice-chairman of the Bank of Paris and the Netherlands and a director of many companies. In 1954 he became a member of the Council of Regents of the Catholic Institute of Paris. Jules Aubrun died on 8 February 1959.

== Sources ==
- Aron, Aexis (February 1960), "Jules Aubrun", La Jaune et la Rouge (in French)
- Brunet, Luc-André (2017-06-08), Forging Europe: Industrial Organisation in France, 1940–1952, Springer, ISBN 978-1-349-95198-7
- Favre, Jean Hervé, "Auguste Vidor", Geneanet (in French)
- Jules Antoine Marie Philippe Aubrun (1881-1959) (in French), Annales des Mines
- Kipping, Matthias; Bjarnar, Ove (2002-09-11), The Americanisation of European Business, Routledge, ISBN 978-1-134-69373-3
- Monnet, Jean (1950), Letter from Jean Monnet to Jules Aubrun (17 November 1950), L’Université du Luxembourg
