= Frédéric Delafond =

French geologist and mining engineer

Frédéric Delafond (2 February 1844 in Igé, Saône-et-Loire – November 1933 in Paris) was a French geologist and mining engineer.

He received his education at the École Polytechnique and at the École des Mines in Paris. From 1909 to 1914 he was director of the École des Mines. Henry Küss was named as his successor.

In 1911 he was named president of the Commission du grisou, and in 1913 he became a commander of the Légion d'honneur. In 1924 he was appointed president of the Société géologique de France.

== Published works ==
- Carte géologique détaillée de la France 1:80.000, (with Michel-Lévy; H Thomas), 1882 – Detailed geological map of France.
- Les terrains tertiaires de la Bresse et leur gîtes de lignites et de minerais de fer, 1883 – Tertiary terrain of Bresse and its deposits of lignite and iron ore.
- Bassin houiller et permien de Blanzy et du Creusot (with René Zeiller), 2 volumes 1902-06 – Permian coalfield of Blanzy and Creusot.
- Bassin houiller et permien d'Autun et d'Épinac (with Michel Lévy; Bernard Renault; René Zeiller; Henri Émile Sauvage), 5 volumes and 2 atlases, 1889–96 – Permian coalfield of Autun and Épinac.
- Tectonique du Massif central, 1922 – Tectonics of the Massif Central.
