= Vonges =

- Commune
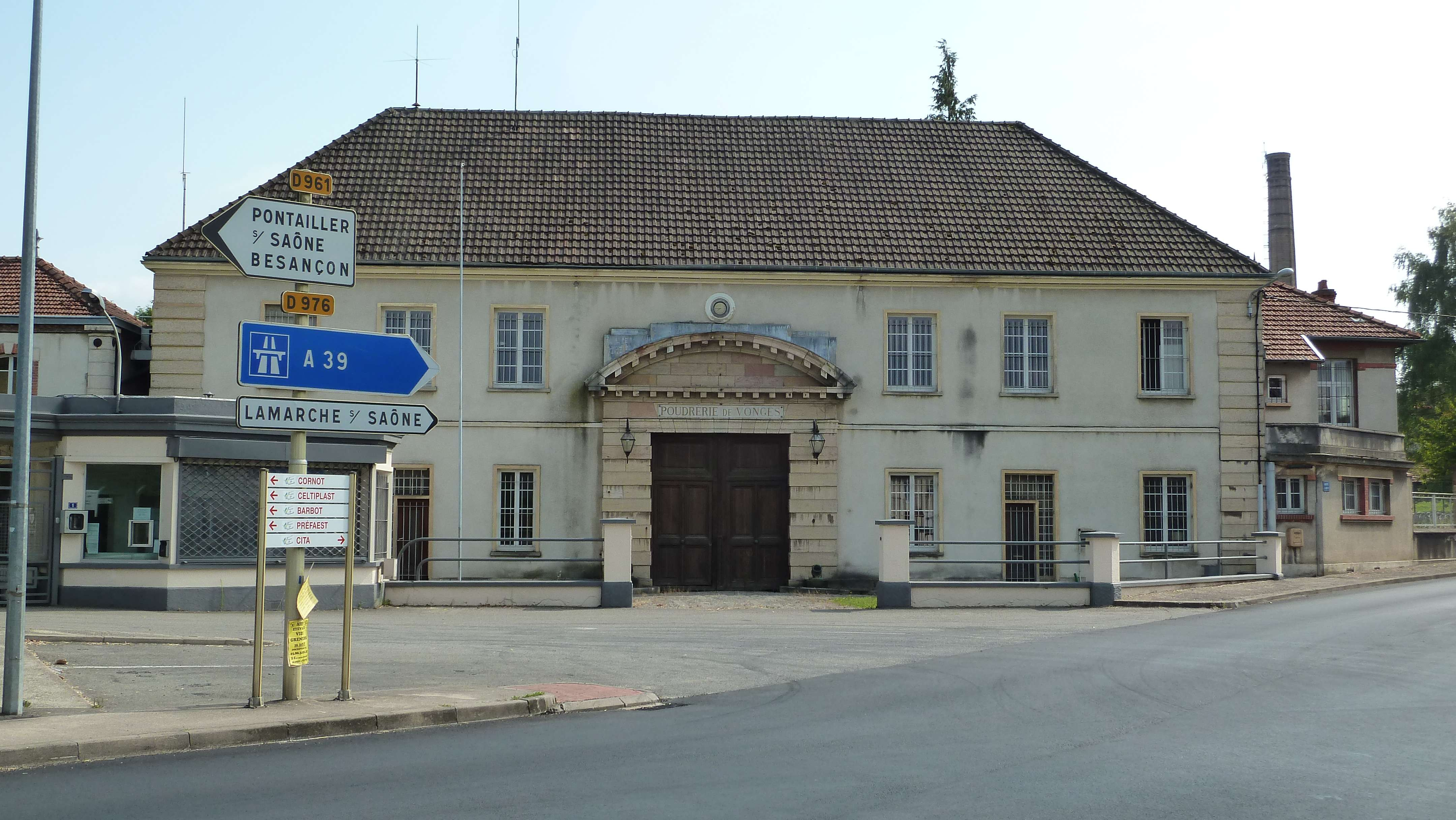
- The old royal gunpowder factory in Vonges
- Location of Vonges
- Location within France Location within Bourgogne-Franche-Comté
- Coordinates: 47°17′35″N 5°24′01″E
- Country: France
- Region: Bourgogne-Franche-Comté
- Department: Côte-d'Or
- Arrondissement: Dijon
- Canton: Auxonne
- Intercommunality: Auxonne Pontailler Val de Saône

Government
  - Mayor (2020–2026): Richard Roussel
- Area^{1}: 4.56 km^{2} (1.76 sq mi)
- Elevation: 214 m (702 ft)
- Highest elevation: 207 m (679 ft)
- Lowest elevation: 182 m (597 ft)
- Population (2023): 358
  - Density: 78.5/km^{2} (203/sq mi)
- Time zone: UTC+01:00 (CET)
  - Summer (DST): UTC+02:00 (CEST)
- INSEE/Postal code: 21713 /21270
- ^{1} French Land Register data, which excludes lakes, ponds, glaciers > 1 km^{2} (0.386 sq mi or 247 acres) and river estuaries.

Vonges (French pronunciation: [vɔ̃ʒ]) is a commune in the Côte-d'Or department in eastern France.

The commune is known for the Poudrerie nationale de Vonges (Vonges National Powder Mill), a powder mill established in 1691 and still operating as of 2012.

== Population ==
Historical population
Year	Pop.	±% p.a.
1968	612	—
1975	504	−2.74%
1982	325	−6.08%
1990	283	−1.71%
1999	313	+1.13%
2007	335	+0.85%
2012	360	+1.45%
2017	342	−1.02%
2023	358	+0.76%
Source: INSEE

== See also ==
- Communes of the Côte-d'Or department
