= Poudrerie nationale de Vonges =

French powder mill

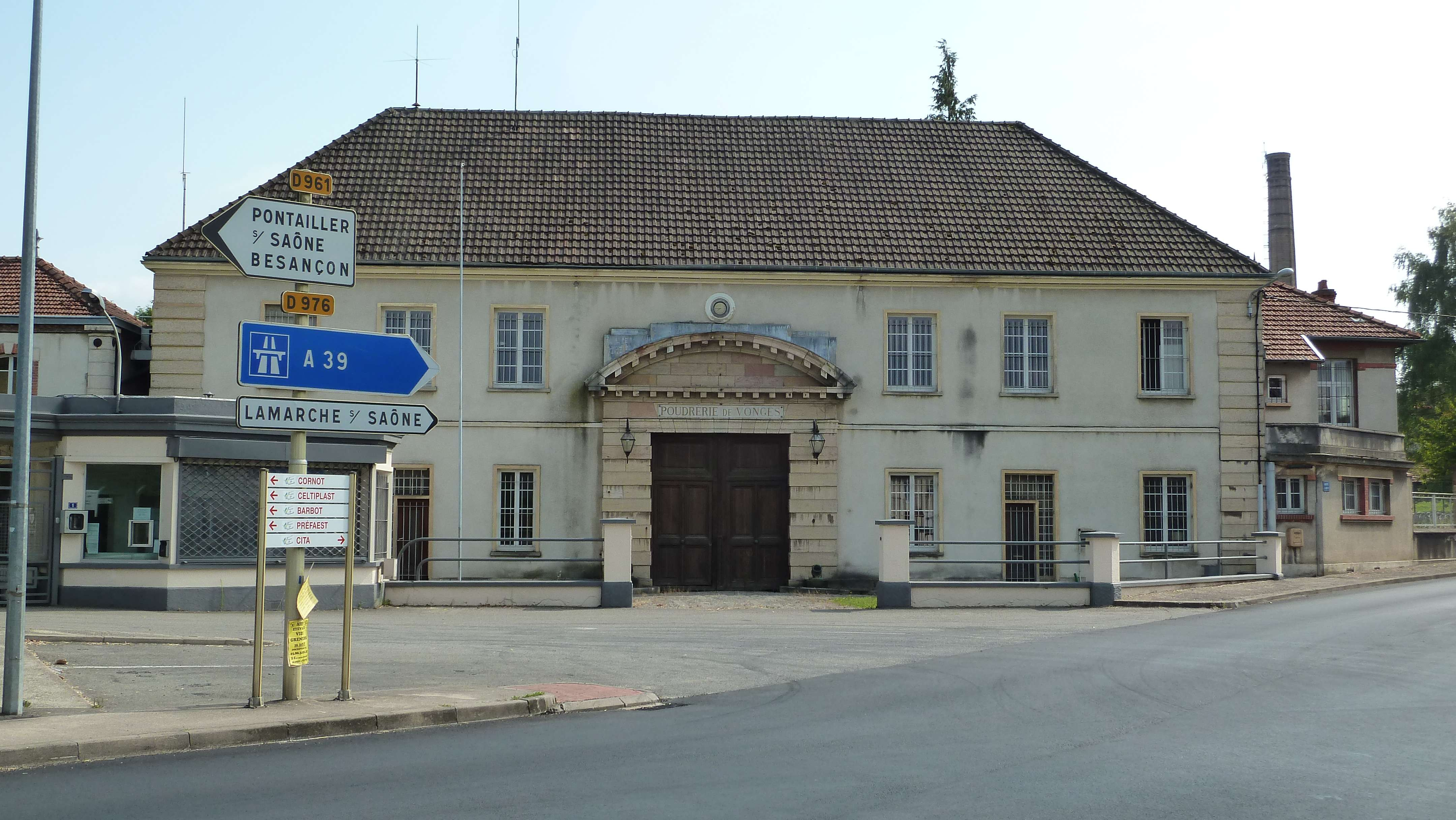
- Main entrance of the powder mill

- Location in France
- Built: 1691
- Location: Vonges, Côte-d'Or, France; Vonges, Côte-d'Or
- Coordinates: 47.292°N 5.4006°E
- Industry: Munitions
- Area: 300 hectares (740 acres)
- Owner: Titanobel

The Poudrerie nationale de Vonges (Vonges National Powder Mill) is a French powder mill established in 1691 in Vonges, Côte-d'Or. It manufactured explosives for use in quarries, mines and fireworks. During World War I (1914–18) it manufactured munitions. It expanded after the war, producing explosives for civil use. During World War II (1939–45) production was scaled back drastically, but expanded again after the war. The powder mill was fully privatized in 2008.

== Location and facilities ==
The powder mill is located in the communes of Vonges and Pontailler-sur-Saône, 30 kilometres (19 mi) east of Dijon in the department of the Côte d'Or. The site is bounded by the Bèze and Saône rivers. Etienne Berthelot de Planeuf, Commissary General of Powders and Saltpeter, leased the site beside the Bèze river on 20 February 1691 to build two powder mills, a powder grinder, a winter dryer, a powder magazine and a small refinery. The five year leases were renewed until July 1753, when the site was purchased outright by Charles-Emmanuel Pioche, Inspector-General of Powder and Saltpeter. A decree by the King in the Council of State of 18 January 1757 confirmed that the contract was perpetual. The facilities were expanded with another powder mill, a moulder and a shed.

The General Services buildings were erected in 1810–13, and another powder magazine was built in 1825. Further extensions began in 1839, and the facilities were completely overhauled. There were offices, manufacturing buildings and dwellings to the east of the powder mill, and around a yard to the west there were storage buildings, carpentry and cooperage workshops. Between 1840 and 1850 two canals were built to supply hydraulic machinery. Earth banks and rows of trees secured the site.

== Operations ==
The main products produced by the Vonges powder mill were gunpowder, potassium chlorate powders (Cheddite type powders) and nitrogenous and chlorinated explosives. Private companies packaged the powders into cartridges for mine and quarry explosives. The institution also conducted surveillance and inspection of industrial establishments and fireworks factories using the explosives. The number of products increased through the 19th and early 20th century. The facility developed manufacture of chlorate explosives, or "mine powders", for use in iron ore mines in the Briey basin. In 1870 the mill was one of four military powder works, under the direction of an artillery colonel. On 31 May 1873 the powder mill held an auction of 29,000 kilograms (64,000 lb) of glycerol, 176,000 kilograms (388,000 lb) of sulfuric acid and 83,000 kilograms (183,000 lb) of nitric acid.

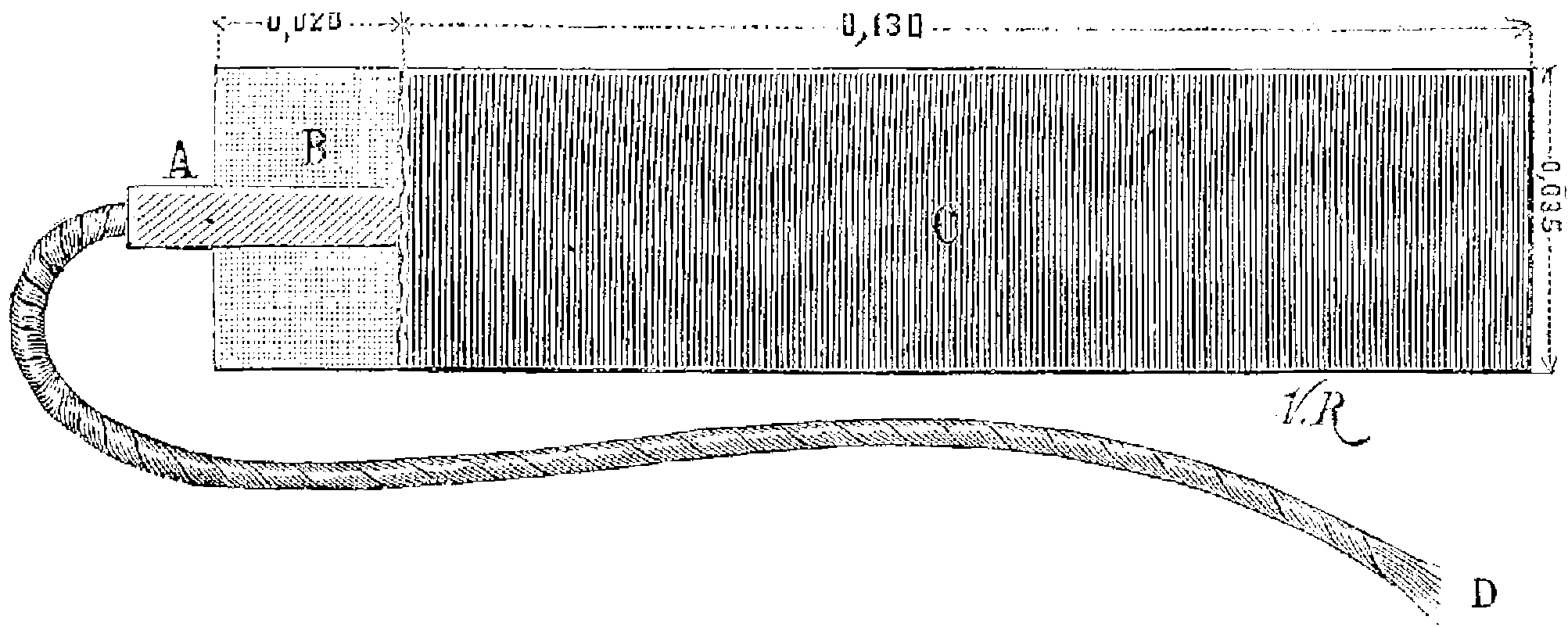
Dynamite cartridge with fuse for military use, made at the Poudrerie de Vonges

In the 1870s another 7 hectares (17 acres) were added for a dynamite factory. The official composition of the dynamite at this and other French powder works was 75% nitroglycerin, 20.8% randanite silica, 3.8% Vierzon silica and 0.4% magnesium carbonate. There were explosions in 1881 and 1882. Production of dynamite was stopped in 1885. In September 1887 the powder mill sold 16,551 kilograms (36,489 lb) of dynamite to the Société générale de dynamite in Paris that was declared to be superior but was found to be inert. The dynamite was of very low quality, with the cartridges holding about 30% nitroglycerin.

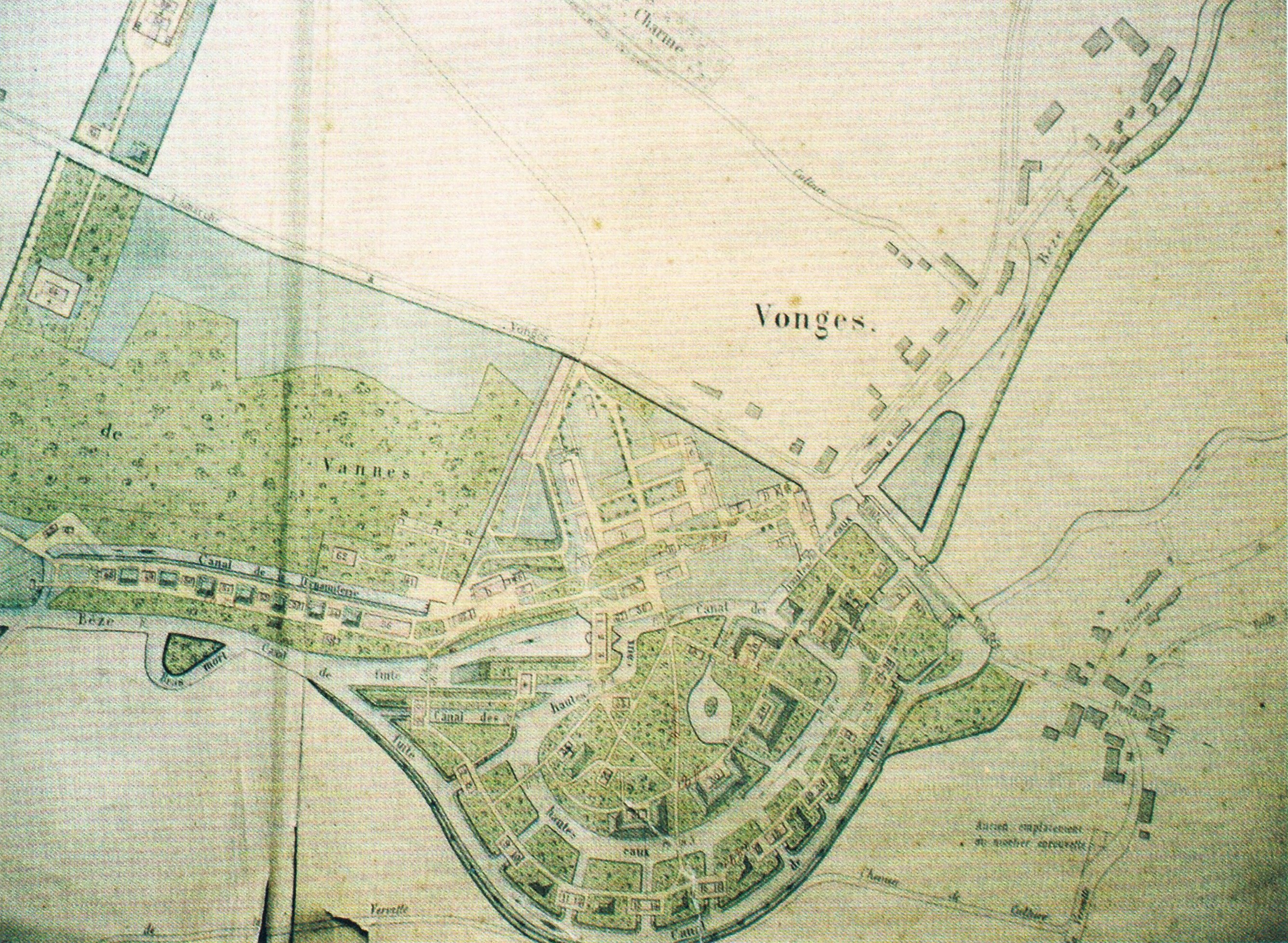
Map of the powder mill in 1884

In 1875 the powder mill covered over 18 hectares (44 acres). In 1876 a small amount of land was acquired for more buildings. An earth embankment was built in 1877. Buildings continued to be added or rebuilt in the years that followed, including factories, sheds and lodgings, and trees were planted. As of 1890 the powder mill covered 34.5 hectares (85 acres) and employed 204 workers.

By 1891 the powder mill was one of ten in France, the others being at Esquerdes, Saint-Poncy, Le Ripault (Monts, Indre-et-Loire), Pont de Buis, Angoulême, Saint-Chamas, Toulouse, Saint-Médard and Sevran-Livry. At the start of the 20th century the powder mill manufactured gunpowder, picric acid, cresylite (trinitrocresol and picric acid), TNT, Cheddites and the "prométhée" explosive.

== World Wars (1914–45) ==
At the start of the World War I (1914–18) the site covered 66 hectares (160 acres), and had an interior network of Decauville railways between the facilities. The daily production capacity was 4 tons of gunpowder, 7 tons of melinite, 5 tons of cheddite and 1 ton of nitronaphthalene, produced by 281 workers. Capacity expanded steadily to produce a greater quantity and variety of explosives. The powder mill was connected to the Auxonne-Gray railway line, and the internal railway network was expanded. A wharf was built on the Saône for water transport. The manufacturing and storage facilities were expanded and barracks were built to house a rapidly growing workforce. The mining engineer Jules Aubrun was assigned to the powder mill in 1915–16.

By May 1918 the facility covered 97 hectares (240 acres) and employed 2,744 workers. Of these, 384 were civilian workers, 1,170 were enlisted workers and 1,142 were Algerians and colonials. The others were managers, engineers and technicians. After the war production of gunpowder for use in the mines expanded, and production of "Yonckite" and Favier explosives began. There was an explosion on 7 July 1920, after which the manufacture of chlorate explosives was reorganized. Between 1920 and 1938 the number of employees and workers varied from 407 to 530. By 1928 the site had been expanded through land purchases to 259 hectares (640 acres). A decree of 23 September 1934 classified the mill as being used for storage, handling and manufacture of powders, ammunition, fireworks and explosives, and defined a polygon of isolation around it.

Louis Jean Charles Maurel was the chief engineer at Vonges at the outbreak of World War II until June 1940. He later joined the Armée secrète (AS), was arrested in October 1943 and was shot in February 1944. During World War II (1939-45) German troops entered Vonges on 15 June 1940, and the French retreated to Toulouse. Italian aircraft bombed the facility on 16 June 1940 and destroyed the General Service buildings. The personnel returned from Toulouse in August 1940. Production of explosives and gunpowder resumed in October 1940 at a reduced level, since the powder mill could not supply customers in the unoccupied zone of France. Delivery wagons were requisitioned by the German authorities, preventing deliveries, and the growth of stocks raised the risk of explosions.

After December 1940 the Germans took control of the facility and authorized deliveries of powders and explosives to the mines. Starting in 1943 the operation was severely affected by workers being requisitioned to work in Germany, and others leaving the powder mill to avoid being sent to Germany. The number of workers dropped from 311 to 174, and output dropped correspondingly. After the Liberation of France the personnel were purged before production was restarted.

== Later developments ==
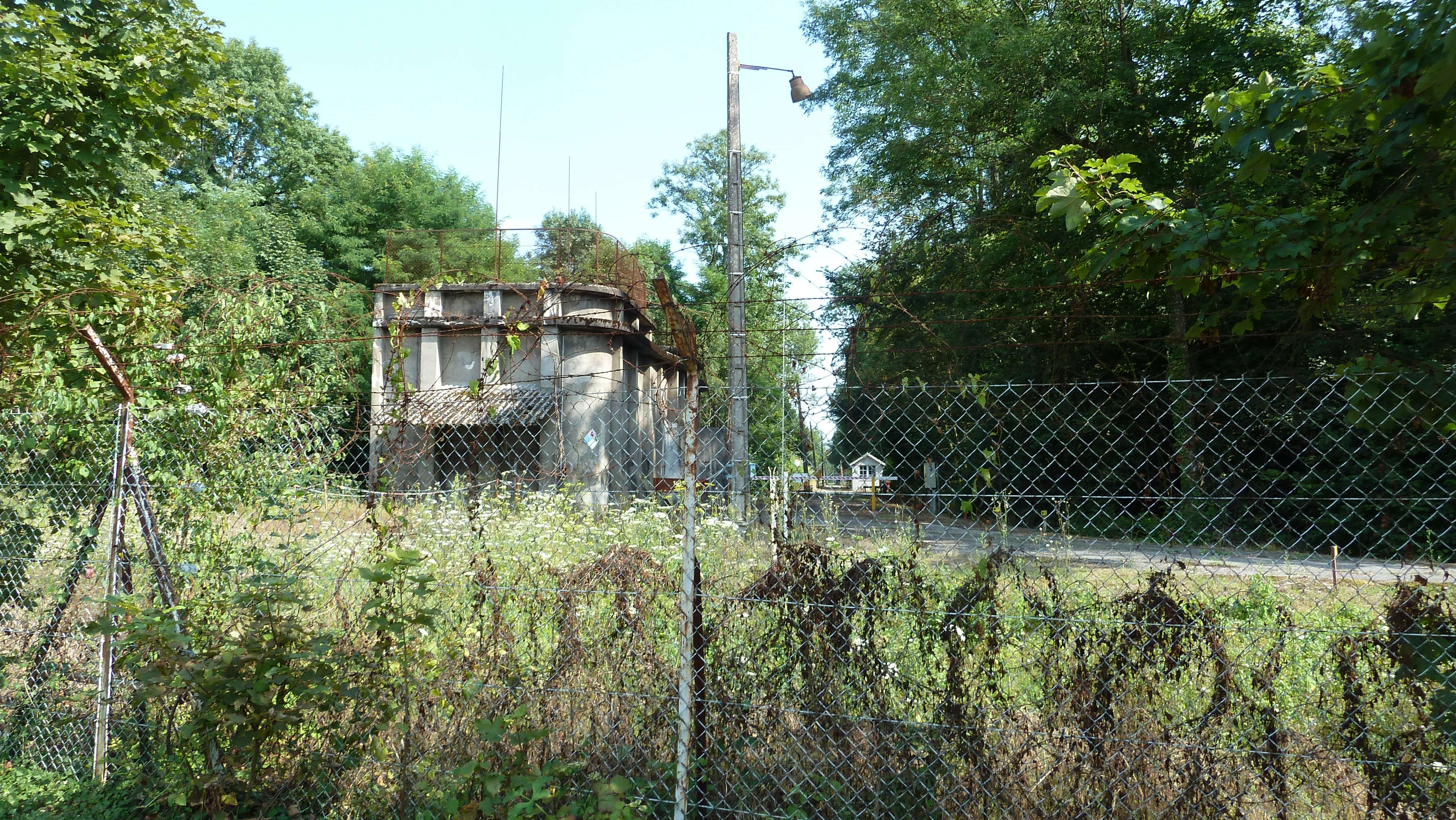
View from the sports facility

In the 1950s the French powder mills expanded their exports. In 1957 the Vonges facility covered 300 hectares (740 acres), of which 100 hectares (250 acres) were wooded. In the late 1960s there were 500 employees producing gunpowder and nitrate and chlorate explosives. Around this time the mill diversified into producing composite materials and industrial paint. A decree of 19 March 1963 extended the polygon of isolation. The powder mill included a medical service, a social service and a school for apprentices. On 28 February 1970 as part of a reform of the Powder Department the Esquerdes Powder Mill in the Pas de Calais was closed and annexed to the Vonges Powder Mill.

In 1971 the Société Nationale des Poudres et Explosifs (SNPE) took over all the manufacturing and sales of the government's powder department, including the Vonges Powder Mill, which continued to manufacture gunpowder and industrial explosives cartridges, as well as plastic parts for industrial use. The state was the majority shareholder in the SNPE. In 1995 Nobel explosifs France was created as a subsidiary of SNPE. In 2008 this subsidiary was merged with the private company Titanite to create Titanobel, now fully private. As of 2012 the Vonges Power Mill was operated by Titanobel. Titanobel SAS manufactures and markets explosives in France and abroad for use in mines, quarries and other works. A decree of 1 July 2013 repealed the decrees of 1934 and 1963 that defined the site's use and its polygons of isolation.

== Sources ==
- Aron, Aexis (February 1960), "Jules AUBRUN", La Jaune et la Rouge (in French)
- "Company Overview of TITANOBEL SAS", Bloomberg
- Figuier, Louis (1891), Les Merveilles de la science ou description populaire des inventions modernes (in French), vol. 2 des Suppléments, pp. 81-152)., Furne, Jouvet et Cie
- France (1873), Journal officiel de la République Française: 1873, 5 - 6, Journaux Officiels
- "JORF n°0152 du 3 juillet 2013 page 11111 texte n° 23", Legifrance (in French)
- Lacour, Marion; Muller, Laurent (July 2012), Archives de la poudrerie nationale de Vonges (1808-1958) (PDF) (in French), Centre des archives de l’armement et du personnel
- Maitron, MAUREL Louis, Jean, Charles (in French), Fusillés/Editions de l'Atelier
- Mirallès, Safia; Bourbonnais, Vanessa (26 July 2012), Gestion Du Personnel De La Poudrerie Nationale De Vonges (PDF) (in French), Centre des archives de l’armement et du personnel civil
- Saint-André, J. A. de (1890), La question des monopoles: les poudres et salpêtres : conférences documentaires (in French), Guillaumin
