= Théodore Laurent =

- Théodore Laurent
- Born: Francois Arthur Théodore Laurent; 18 December 1863; Saint-Jean-d'Angély, Charente-Maritime, France
- Died: 21 August 1953 (aged 89); Paris IX, France
- Occupation: Industrialist
- Known for: President of Marine-Homécourt

Théodore Laurent (18 December 1863 – 21 August 1953) was a French engineer and industrialist who was president of the steelmaker Marine-Homécourt for many years. He was a major force in organizing the French steel industry before and after World War II.

== Early years (1863–1908) ==
François Arthur Théodore Laurent was born on 18 December 1863 in Saint-Jean-d'Angély. He was the son of Aimé Laurent a banker and cognac dealer in Saint-Jean-d'Angély, and Anne Nancy Cora Valleau. He attended the École Polytechnique from 1883 to 1885, then the École des mines de Paris from 1885. He became a member of the Corps des mines, and worked for the Corps des Mines in Moulins, then Angers. On 28 September 1889 he married Elisabeth Marie Sophie Hallé (4 July 1870 – 18 April 1928) at Châtres, Seine-et-Marne. They had four sons, Jacques, Daniel, Pierre and Jean. (Note: Théodore Laurent's son Jean Laurent volunteered for the army and died on 23 May 1917 at the age of 20 just after receiving the Legion of Honour.)

Laurent left the Corps des mines to become Engineer at the Chemins de fer du Midi, then Chief Engineer and Deputy Chief of Equipment at the Chemins de fer d'Orléans, two railway lines. During this period he came to know the main leaders of the French metallurgical industry. At the start of 1908 he was offered the post of deputy-director of the Compagnie des forges et aciéries de la marine et d'Homécourt (Marine-Homécourt). He accepted the job after some hesitation at the end of the year.

== Marine-Homécourt (1908–52) ==
Soon after joining the company, Laurent arranged for Marine-Homécourt, Aciéries de Micheville and Pont à Mousson to form the MarMichPont group to acquire Belgian and German coal mines and coking ovens to address their common shortage of fuel. In 1911 he was made director-general in succession to Claudius Magnin. He reported to Emile Heurteau, his former boss at the Paris-Orleans railway and chairman of Marine from 1915 to 1927. During World War I (1914–18) Laurent lived at Saint-Chamond, Loire, organizing production of munitions. He built up the Marine-Homécourt works into one of France's main arsenals. After the war he rebuilt the plant at Homécourt and expanded the company both nationally and internationally.

Laurent succeeded Heurteau as head of Marine-Homécourt in 1927. Laurent, François de Wendel and Eugène Schneider formed a triumvirate that dominated French steel-making in the inter-war period. Laurent transformed Marine-Homécourt, already a powerful company, into an industrial empire. Laurent decided to remove his son Jacques from the succession, although Jacques was vice-president of the Marine-Homécourt group from 1928 to 1967. Instead he groomed Léon Daum as his successor. In April 1925 Léon Daum was appointed deputy director general of Marine-Homécourt and in 1927 he was made general director by Laurent.

Laurent was involved in many enterprises, and constantly adapted them to changing conditions. In 1940 he held 79 directorships. It was due in part to his example that the government passed a law on 16 November 1940 that limited the number of directorships one person could hold. He promoted industrial concentrations, particularly Sidelor (1950) and the great metallurgical combinations of the Loire. He had a paternalistic attitude to the workers, taking a serious interest in their welfare, but having little discussion with them. He took part in commissions to fight tuberculosis, founded the Saint-Hilaire du Touvet sanatorium, and was involved in social housing.

== Last years (1952–53) ==
Laurent was made a Grand Officer of the Legion of Honor. On 24 April 1952 Léon Daum, now vice president and general manager of Marine-Homécourt, was made a commander of the Legion of Honour by Théodore Laurent. Although he had been trained to succeed Laurent as managing director of Marine-Homécourt, when Laurent was reappointed for yet another six years Daum gave up and resigned. On 10 August 1952 Daum was appointed chairman of the European Coal and Steel Community finance, investment & production group. Laurent finally resigned from the presidency of Marine-Homécourt in March 1953, a few months before his death. He participated in meetings of the board of directors until the last days before his death. The end of his reign was difficult. Although his mind was still lively he had an irascible temper, poor eyesight and was almost deaf. Théodore Laurent died in Paris IX on 21 August 1953 at the age of 89.

== Publications ==
Publications included:

- Théodore Laurent (1912), "Le Développement économique de la France. L'industrie métallurgique", Conférence faite au Musée social, le 13 février 1912, Paris: A. Rousseau, pp. 89–146
- Théodore aurent (1913), "Groupe XVIII, classes 107 A, 108, 109. Métallurgie", République française. Ministère du Commerce et de l'industrie. Exposition internationale des industries et du travail de Turin, 1911, Paris: Comité français des expositions à l'étranger, p. 172

== Sources ==
- "François Arthur Théodore LAURENT (1863-1953)", Les Annales des Mines
- François-Poncet, André; Daum, Léon; Mgr. Méjacaze (1955), Théodore Laurent, 1863-1953. L'industriel. L'homme (in French), Paris: G. Malochet, p. 175
- "Léon DAUM (1887-1966)", Annales des Mines
- Members of the High Authority of the European Coal and Steel Community (ECSC), CVCE, 27 July 2016
- Mioche, Philippe; Roux, Jacques (1988), Henri Malcor : Un héritier des maîtres de forge (in French), Paris: Editions du CNRS
- Pierfit, "François Arthur Théodore LAURENT", Geneanet (in French)
- Smith, Michael Stephen (2006), The Emergence of Modern Business Enterprise in France, 1800-1930, Harvard University Press, ISBN 978-0-674-01939-3
- Théodore Laurent (1863-1953) (in French), BnF: Bibliotheque nationale de France
- Vinen, Richard (2002-07-11), Bourgeois Politics in France, 1945-1951, Cambridge University Press, ISBN 978-0-521-52276-2
