= Auguste Daum =

French ceramist (1853–1909)

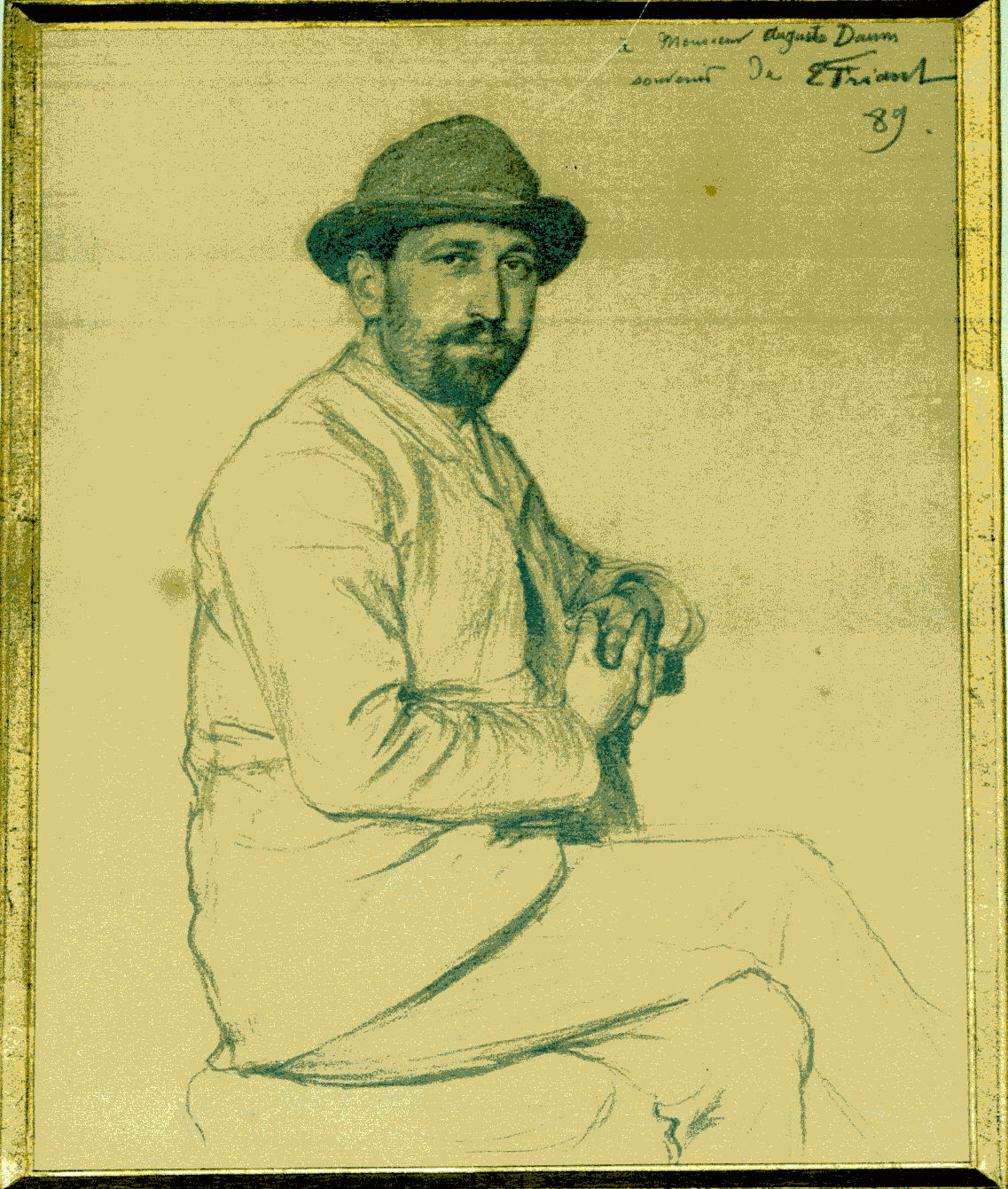
Auguste Daum by Émile Friant, fonds famille Daum

Jean Louis Auguste Daum (1853 in Bitche – 1909 in Nancy) was a French ceramist, in glass.

He was one of the founder members of École de Nancy and the director of Daum studio. He was the son of Jean Daum, brother of Antonin Daum and father of Léon Daum.
