= Léon Daum =

French mining engineer

- Born: 21 March 1887; Nancy, France
- Died: 28 May 1966 (aged 79); Paris, France

Léon Daum (21 March 1887 – 28 May 1966) was a French mining engineer, company director and senior European administrator. He was a member of the High Authority of the European Coal and Steel Community from 1952 to 1959.

== Origins ==
Léon Daum's grandfather was Jean Daum (1825–85), a notary in Bitche who settled in Nancy in 1871. Jean Daum became a master glass maker in 1876, and from 1878 was the owner of the Fonderies de Nancy. Léon's parents were Jean Louis Auguste Daum (1853–1909) and Jeanne Constantin (d. 1921). Auguste Daum started as a notary's clerk but in 1885 joined Jean Daum in managing the glass factory. Auguste Daum became president of the Nancy Commercial Court in 1904. Léon's brother Antonin Jean Daum (1864–1930) trained as an engineer at the École Centrale, took over technical direction of the Daum company and then headed the company after Auguste Daum died in 1909. The Daum family influenced the Art Nouveau movement with their ceramic art of the École de Nancy.

== Early years ==
Léon Daum was born in Nancy on 21 March 1887. He attended the École Polytechnique from 1905 to 1907, then went on to the École des mines de Paris. He joined the Corps des mines. He was sent on a mission to the United States and Canada from May to November 1911. He became an engineer at the Douai mines in 1911. The Clarence catastrophe occurred there on 3 September 1912. Léon was cited by the Corps des mines for the devotion and technical wisdom he applied to the perilous work of assisting the victims. On 5 June 1913 Léon Daum married Jeanne Poincaré, daughter of the mathematician Henri Poincaré (1854–1912). They had no children, and his wife became blind when she was aged 40. Around 1919 his mother-in-law asked him to review a proposed posthumous collection of Poincare's articles. He took the task seriously, and wrote a long note in which he argued that the collection had little value as a philosophical collection.

== Industrial administrator ==
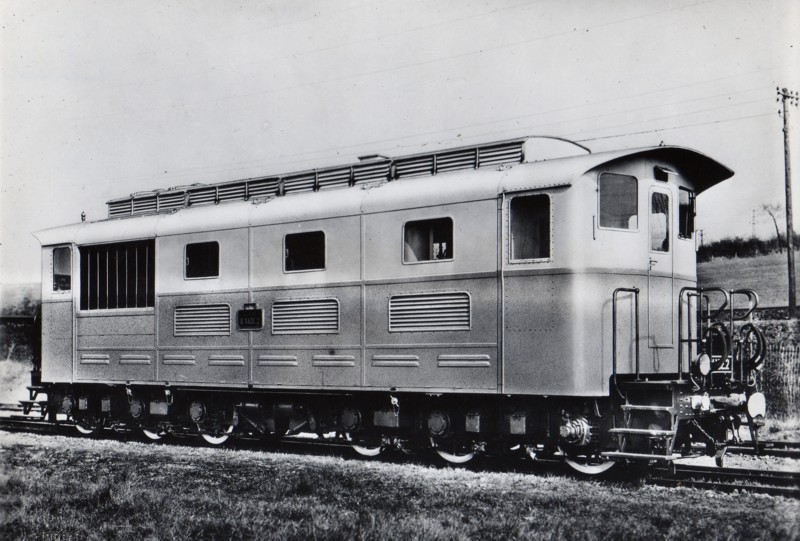
Diesel locomotive built by Marine-Homécourt in 1937

Daum was head of the mines department in Morocco from December 1913 to July 1914. During World War I (1914–18) he was an artillery captain from 1914 to 1917. He returned to Morocco from November 1917 to December 1918. In January 1919 he was appointed head of the mines control department of the Saar. In January 1920 he was appointed personnel director of the Saar mines, and in January 1921 was appointed chief engineer of the mines. In May 1921 he joined the Compagnie des forges et aciéries de la marine et d'Homécourt as chief engineer.

In 1923 Daum participated in the Inter-Allied Mission for Control of Factories and Mines (MICUM) during the occupation of the Ruhr. In April 1925 he was appointed deputy director general of Marine-Homécourt and in 1927 he was made general director by its head, Théodore Laurent. Daum was discharged from the Corps des mines in 1929. Between 1930 and 1939 Marine-Homécourt suffered from the depression, strikes and the flooding of the Homécourt mine. While at Marine-Homécourt he was also a director of Hauts fournaux de Givors, Aciéries de Dilling, and Crédit National.

Léon Daum was one of the leaders of the Comité des forges, the French steelmaker's association. Under the Vichy regime the Comité des forges was dissolved by decree on 9 November 1940. It was replaced by the Comité d'organisation de la sidérurgie (CORSID – Organizing Committee for the Iron and Steel Industry). Léon Daum was the only member of the Comité des forges to be appointed to CORSID. On this committee he represented the Centre-Midi iron and steel industry. He said, "When a government gathers together men who are called Petain, Weygand, Darlan, and these men tell us that we cannot do anything else but put down our weapons, you have to believe them." He was on the committee from 1940 to 1945.

== Post-war ==
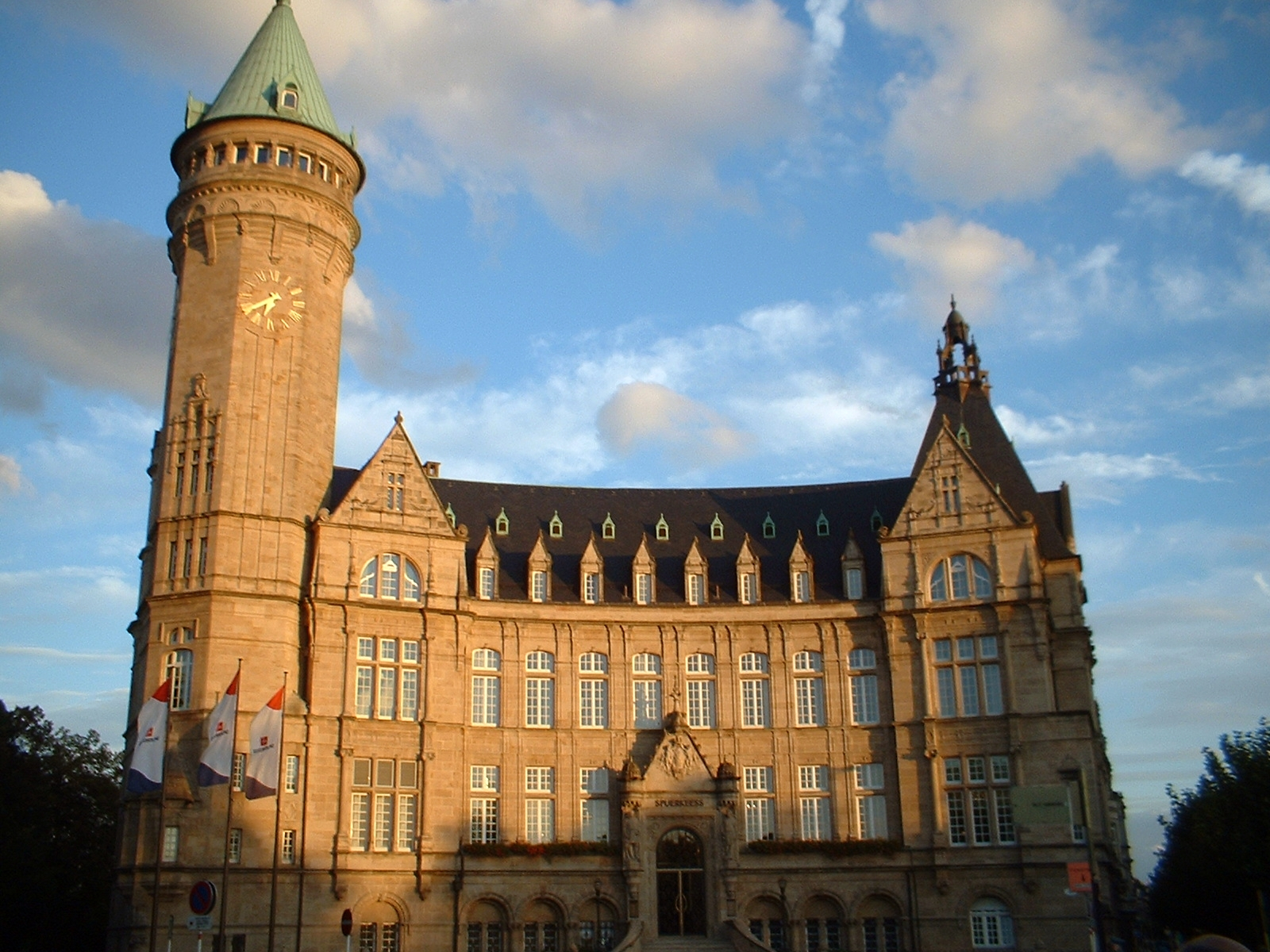
Main Building of the BCEE, former seat of the ECSC's High Authority

After the Liberation of France Daum was appointed president of Rombas to revive that company. In 1945 Daum was one of the founders of the Association of Executive Managers of Industry (ACADI: Association des Cadres Dirigeants de l'Industrie). In 1948 he was a member of the French delegation to the Organisation for European Economic Co-operation (OEEC) Steel Committee, then chairman of this Committee. In 1948 he promoted the creation of Sollac. He facilitated the creation of Sidelor, and prepared the merger of Marine-Homécourt with the Aciéries de Saint-Etienne. In 1949 Daum was appointed vice president and general manager of Marine-Homécourt. On 24 April 1952 he was made a commander of the Legion of Honour by Théodore Laurent.

Although he had been trained to succeed Laurent as managing director of Marine-Homécourt, when the 90-year-old Laurent was reappointed for another six years at the age of 90 he gave up and resigned. At the request of Robert Schuman he agreed to become one of the first nine members of the European Coal and Steel Community (ECSC). Daum was a member of the High Authority of the European Coal and Steel Community from 1952 to 1959. He was expected to be an effective representative of French industrial interests, but in fact he took a detached long-term view and was soon the target of complaints of indifference from the steel associations.

From 10 August 1952 to 3 June 1955 under the presidency of Jean Monnet he was chairman of the ECSC finance, investment & production group and of the instructions group, and a member of the long-term policy group, the markets, agreements & transport group and the press and information group. From 3 June 1955 to 13 January 1958 under the presidency of René Mayer he was chairman of the industrial problems & finance group and of the Instructions group, and was a member of the general objectives and long-term policy group, the markets, agreements & transport group and the press and information group. From 13 January 1958 to 14 September 1959 under the presidency of Paul Finet he was chairman of the investment and production group and a member of the external relations group, the coal & contracts group and the steel, transport & concentrations group.

Daum promoted the use of Esperanto, and this became one of his main activities after he retired in 1959. Léon Daum died in Paris on 28 May 1966.

== Publications ==
- Daum, Léon (1918), Les richesses du sous-sol marocain : Conférence faite au centre de perfectionnement de Meknès, Troupes d'occupation du Maroc, Etat-Major général (in French), Casablanca: Rapide : G. Mercié, p. 19
- François-Poncet, André; Daum, Léon; Méjacaze (Mgr) (1955), Théodore Laurent, 1863-1953. L'industriel. L'homme (in French), Paris: G. Malochet, p. 175

== Sources ==
- Brunet, Luc-André (2017-06-08), Forging Europe: Industrial Organisation in France, 1940–1952, Springer, ISBN 978-1-349-95198-7
- Carbonnell, Mauve (2009), "Victors and Venquished of WWII", Les deux europes, Peter Lang, ISBN 978-90-5201-481-4
- Ehrmann, Henry Walter (2015-12-08), Organized Business in France, Princeton University Press, ISBN 978-1-4008-7832-1
- J.M. (August–September 1966), "IN MEMORIAM 21 mars 1887 - 28 mai 1966", La Jaune et la Rouge (in French)
- "Léon DAUM (1887-1966)", Annales des Mines
- Members of the High Authority of the European Coal and Steel Community (ECSC), CVCE, 27 July 2016
- Poincaré, Henri (2012-02-02), Scientific Opportunism L'Opportunisme scientifique: An Anthology, Birkhäuser, ISBN 978-3-0348-8112-8
- Vinen, Richard (2002-07-11), Bourgeois Politics in France, 1945-1951, Cambridge University Press, ISBN 978-0-521-52276-2
