= Plichon =

Plichon is a French surname. Notable people with the surname include:

- Charles Ignace Plichon (1814–88), French lawyer, businessman and politician
- Jean Plichon (1863–1936), French industrialist and politician
- Jean-Pierre Plichon (1907–66), French engineer and politician
