= Pierre de Saintignon =

French politician (1948–2019)

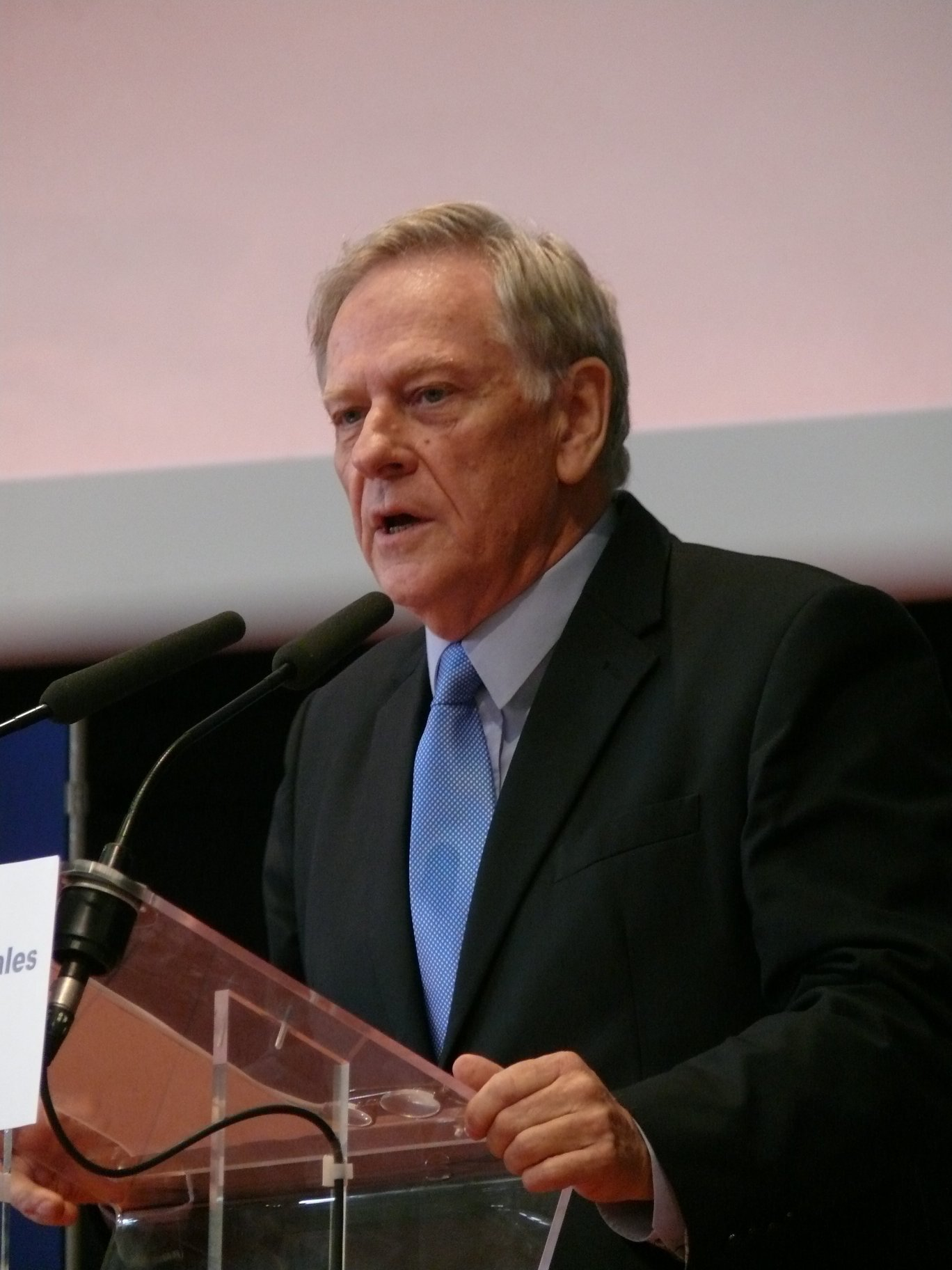
Pierre De Saintignon in 2014 in Lille

Pierre de Saintignon (22 May 1948 – 9 March 2019) was a French politician. He was a member of the French Socialist Party (Parti Socialiste or PS) since 1967. He was elected councilor to the Lille municipality in 1989, 1995, 2001, 2008 and 2014, the first two terms under Pierre Mauroy and the other three under Martine Aubry. From 2001, he was the First Deputy-Mayor, in charge of finance, economic development and military matters. In 1998, 2004 and 2010 he was elected councilor the Regional Council of Nord-Pas-de-Calais, where he sat as first vice-president, in charge of economic development. Most of his political career was as an unofficial chief of staff, rather than as a foreground person. He was chosen to lead the PS list for the 2015 regional elections that were held on 6 and 13 December 2015.

Since the polls were not good (below 20% for the first step and below 33% for the second), an alleged lack of notoriety had been put forward as a possible explanation. In this context, an experiment was launched by the Nord Littoral newspaper in order to measure if the candidate was sufficiently well known to deserve an entry in the French Wikipedia. The result was a controversy that has been covered by the major national newspapers.

Preferring to finally withdraw due to poor results in the first round, Pierre de Saintignon was forced to play only the role of an unofficial advisor to the Haut-de-France region's president.

Pierre de Saintignon died on 9 March 2019.

== Childhood and studies ==
Pierre de Saintignon was born on 22 May 1948 in Angers, the third in a family of five boys. His mother, Monique Larmoyer, was a speech and language therapist. His father, François de Saintignon (1912–1972), a lawyer (avocat), had been held prisoner during World War II, and afterwards became Directeur de la Population (Director of Health and Welfare) for the Maine-et-Loir department.

The Saintignon were a Lotharingian noble family from Verdun. Notable members of the family were Fernand de Saintignon (1846–1921), ironmaster at Longwy, and Pierre Amidieu du Clos (1881–1955), deputy and mayor of Longwy.

As a child, Pierre de Saintignon was impaired by dyslexia. He recalled in an interview that Claude Chassagny, founder of the relational pedagogy of language, told to his mother, "put him on a horse, it is the best mediator". De Saintignon then stated, "the horses have occupied my life for 15 years. It saved me and it's been a great passion". At the end, he reintegrated a standard secondary cursus, obtained his Baccalauréat and started higher studies in economics.

== Intermediate years and move to Lille ==
While living in Paris in 1967, de Sainignon joined the French Section of the Workers' International (SFIO) two years before it was replaced by the Socialist Party (PS). (Note: From this date onwards, Pierre de Saintignon stayed in this party, except from one year in the Robert Fabre's party.) The same year, he entered Inserm (the French Institute of Health and Medical Research, or more precisely the National Technical Centre for Impaired Childhood and Adolescence or CTNEAI). He endorsed missions in five French departments, one of them at Grenoble, with its mayor Hubert Dubedout (PS). He also performed five years of research on child abuse at the Necker-Enfants Malades Hospital.

In 1977, he moved from Paris to Lille, in French Flanders, to become the administrative director of the Sauvegarde du Nord, an association that supported young people facing adversities. He was recruited in 1990 to become a director of Darty, an electrical retailer in France. He worked with the Darty group for 10 years.

== Municipal and regional representative ==
In 1989, PS member and former prime minister Pierre Mauroy, was elected to a third term as Mayor of Lille. Pierre de Saintignon was one of the municipal councilors elected on the PS list, and held this office until his death in 2019. The scores of the PS-led lists in subsequent elections were 53.86% (1989), 48.5% (1995), 49.6% (2001), 66.6% (2008), and 52,05% (2014). (Note: leading to 31+30*(1+x%)/2 seats, i.e. 47 seats for the 2014 election) From 1989, he was in charge of social insertion and economic development. He additionally held the position of First Deputy Mayor from 2001, when Mauroy was succeeded by Martine Aubry.

Since 1998, de Saintignon had also been elected regional councilor. The PS-led coalition obtained 45.13% and 51 seats in 1998; 51.84% and 73 seats in 2004; 51,90% and 73 seats in 2010 (each time from a total of 113 seats). He received the rank of First Vice-President of the Council in charge of economic development.

In addition, de Saintignon was member of the staff of several ministers, such as with Michel Delebarre for the Revenu minimum d'insertion (social welfare) in 1988, and with Martine Aubry, then Ministre du Travail, in 1991. In this service he avoided public attention and acted as a trusted chief of staff. He is often described as a go-between for industry and finance circles and, more generally, as an efficient negotiator.

In a statement released 19 October 2018, de Saintignon stepped down as the PS leader for the region, making way for new leaders ahead of the next regional elections, and called for unity to meet the needs of the region's citizens.

Pierre de Saintignon died five months later, on 9 March 2019.

== The "known for being unknown" controversy ==
For the 2015 regional elections, de Saintignon was chosen to lead the PS list. This was described as a gambit: an able leader who was relatively unknown to the public to create distance from the low popularity of French President François Hollande and the government's policy. When de Saintignon's name was published, opinion polls estimated the PS would receive less than 20% on the first round, with a second-round PS coalition forecast. From 51.90% in 2010, they were expected to fall to 32% or less in 2015, and from 79 to 29 out of 120 elected seats. While the other second-round lists in the North–Pas-de-Calais–Picardy region were headed by the top mediatic leaders of their respective parties, de Saintignon was sometimes described as the "Inconnu du Nord" (English: the unknown of the north). (Note: "Inconnu du Nord" is a probable allusion to L'inconnu du Nord-Express, the French title of the film Strangers on a Train.)

In a press conference held on 23 September 2015, Martine Aubry confirmed the choice of de Saintignon, and that the poor poll results were due to a PS minister's behaviour, stating, "Macron? How to tell it... The cup is full." Backing Emmanuel Macron (appointed 2014 as Minister of Economy), the French Premier likened de Saintignon to a casting error, due to a lack of notoriety. During a France Info broadcast, an interviewer asked if the lack of a French Wikipedia entry for Pierre de Saintignon could be held as an objective measure of a low notoriety. Such an article had been created in July 2015, 6358 bits in length, but had been speedy deleted in less than 2 hours with the verdict: "don't fit the criteria, don't deserve a page."

A journalist at the daily Nord Littoral decided to experiment to understand the process at Wikipedia. With the obvious pseudonym "Nordlittoral", the journalist tried to create a page about Pierre de Saintignon. Within two hours, while the work was in progress, the page was again speedy deleted and locked, with the same non sequitur: "don't fit the criteria, don't deserve a page." The story quickly spread. In the evening, articles were published by Le Monde and Le Figaro, the main national political newspapers. The next day, the story was carried by La Voix du Nord, Le Nouvel Observateur and by RTL radio.

The conclusion of the Nord Littoral's study was "If the new notoriety of Pierre Saintignon deserves an article, administrators should have let our stub stay as a starting point. Except that the debate on his notoriety must be resolved before we can proceed".
