= Georges Izard =

French politician, lawyer, journalist and essayist

Georges Izard (17 June 1903, in Abeilhan, Hérault – 20 September 1973, in Paris) was a French politician, lawyer, journalist and essayist.

== Biography ==
Izard was named chief of staff to Charles Daniélou, then the minister of the merchant marine, whose daughter he married in 1929. ON 26 April 1936, he was elected member of parliament as a candidate of the Frontist Party in Meurthe-et-Moselle against a candidate of the extreme-right, Pierre Amidieu du Clos.

In November 1936, he founded the Frontist Party with Bergery. He left the Frontist party in November 1937 to join the SFIO. In July 1938 he became technical adviser to the Socialist Federation of Meurthe-et-Moselle.

In 1940, as a volunteer soldier, he was taken as a prisoner of war by the Germans. Released for reasons of health, he joined the resistance as part of the Organisation civile et militaire (OCM). From November 1944, he was a member of Provisional Consultative Assembly Constituent Assembly of the Fourth Republic. He was Secretary-General of the OCM from 1945 to 1948. He then pursued a successful legal career. In November 1971, he was named to the Académie française.

Izard died on 20 September 1973.

== Works ==
- La Pensée de Charles Péguy (with Emmanuel Mounier and Marcel Péguy, 1931)
- Où va le communisme ? L'évolution du parti communiste. Les textes (1936)
- La Bataille de la France (Avec André Deléage, Georges Duveau, Jules Roman et L.-E. Galeÿ, 1938)
- Les Classes moyennes (1938)
- Les Coulisses de la Convention (1939)
- Principes de droit civil, Cours professé à l'École supérieure d'organisation professionnelle (1944)
- L'Homme est révolutionnaire (1945)
- Principes de droit civil, Cours professé à l'École nationale d'organisation économique et sociale (1946)
- Viol d'un mausolée, le sens et l'avenir de la déstalinisation (1957)
- Lettre affligée au général de Gaulle (1964)
- Sainte Catherine de Gênes et l'au-delà (1969)
