= Léon Émery =

French pacifist and Nazi collaborator

Member of Human Rights League (France)

Personal details
- Born: 12 February 1898
- Died: December 1981 (aged 83)
- Occupation: Lawyer
- Profession: Human right activist Politician

Léon Émery (12 February 1898 – December 1981) was a French pacifist activist and a French collaborationist with the Nazi regime.

== Biography ==
Émery was a professor at the Lyon's Normal School from 1925 and was a member of the Teachers National Union. He was affiliated with the reformist General Confederation of Labour (France). As a leftist pacifist, denounced fascism in 1934 and joined the Frontist Party of Gaston Bergery and the Comité de vigilance des intellectuels antifascistes (CVIA).

Émery was an active member of the League of Human Rights (LDH). From June 1933 to 1939 he chaired the Lyon and the Rhone sections of the federation. In 1936 he also joined the Lyon committee of LICRA, the International League against Racism and Anti-Semitism.

During the interwar period, Émery worked for several French newspapers, including l’École libératrice, Europe, Feuilles libres de la quinzaine, la Flèche (periodical of Common Front) and la Voix de la paix.

Ultimately, Émery chose his commitments to pacifism over antifascism, and situated himself in the mainstream pacifist tendency which opposed any war, including war against Nazi Germany. He was a member of the Central Committee of the LDH (1934–37). In 1937, however, he, along with his pacifist friends Bergery and Félicien Challaye, resigned from their positions, in defense of peace and in opposition to the League's stance on the Moscow Trials, which Émery denounced. Émery was also opposed to intervention in Spain during the Spanish Civil War. Émery left the LDH in 1939, causing the temporary dissolution of the Rhone section, which was reconstituted under the presidency of André Philip. The day after the declaration of war in September 1939, he co-signed a pacifist pamphlet, drafted by Louis Lecoin, demanding immediate peace. Unlike other signatories, such as Marcel Déat, Émery later admitted to having signed it while facing prosecution.

During the war, Émery adopted an anticommunist position and favored a German victory to "save Europe from Russian imperialism". Just before the war started he joined the Rassemblement National Populaire (RNP), the collaborationist party of Marcel Déat, another leftist pacifist. He supported the Teachers Union of the RNP, founded in 1942, and held conferences sponsored by the RNP which asserted that a destructive war would only benefit "Bolshevism". In 1944 he worked for the weekly newspaper Germinal.

A dogmatic supporter of the Vichy regime's ideology of ‘National Revolution’, his collaborationist proposal to form a "western union" was ineffectual, and ignored by his Maurassian political opponents. However, in 1942–43 he provided ideological education for teachers by sponsoring "Friends of the Marshal" programs at the Allevard School. He was also a lecturer at the École des cadres of the French Legion of Allevard Combatants.

Despite his collaboration with the fascist regime, Émery did not engage in attacks against Jewish people, and saved one Jew from deportation: the integral pacifist Michel Alexandre, with whom he had co-founded the Feuilles libres just before the war. However, historians such as have accused him of ignoring the plight of Jews in Vichy France.

In November 1945 he was imprisoned in the Saint-Paul prison of Lyon. After the war, Émery was sentenced to five years in prison, but was released due to ill health in 1946.

== Bibliography ==
- Epstein, Simon (2008). Michel, Albin (ed.). Un paradoxe français : antiracistes dans la Collaboration, antisémites dans la Résistance (in French). Paris: Bibliothèque de l'histoire. ISBN 978-2-226-17915-9.
