= Robert de Wendel =

French steelmaker

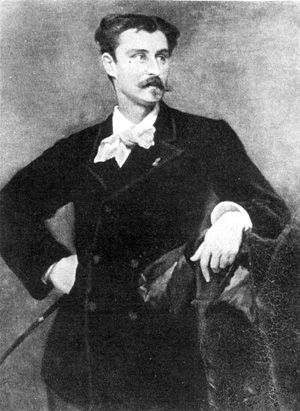
- Robert de Wendel c. 1870
- Born: Adrien Charles Joseph Robert de Wendel d'Hayange; 9 May 1847; Souhey, France
- Died: 27 August 1903 (aged 56); Hayange, France
- Occupation: Steelmaker

Adrien Charles Joseph Robert de Wendel d'Hayange (9 May 1847 – 27 August 1903), often known as Robert de Wendel, was a French steelmaker, heir of a long line of Lorraine industrialists. He and his brother Henri ran several large steelworks in Lorraine. From 1898 until his accidental death in 1903 he was president of the Comité des forges, the French steelmakers' association.

== Early years ==
The de Wendel family can be traced back to Jean Wendel of Bruges, who married Marie de Wanderve around 1600. His descendants in the male line mostly pursued military careers. Jean's descendant Jean-Martin Wendel (1665–1737) purchased the factories of Le Comte in Hayange, Lorraine, in 1704. This was the foundation of the family's industrial operations. He was ennobled as Jean-Martin de Wendel in 1727 by Leopold, Duke of Lorraine. He was followed by eight generations of steelmakers.

Adrien Charles Joseph Robert de Wendel d'Hayange was born on 9 May 1847 in Souhey. He was the second son of Alexis Charles de Wendel d'Hayange (1809–1870) and Jeanne Marie de Pechpeyrou-Comminges de Guitaut. His father was a deputy for Moselle under Napoleon III. His elder brother was Paul François Henri de Wendel (1844–1906) and his younger sister was Marie Louise Caroline de Wendel (1851–1939).

The family lived in the Château d'Hayange. After being devastated by two fires, the building was renovated in 1867, and the west wing was transformed into a home for Robert de Wendel. On 18 May 1869 Robert married Marie Antoinette Elisabeth Carmen Consuelo Manuel de Gramedo (b. 1850) in Paris. Their children were Marthe Charlotte Consuelo Carmen (b. 1870), Ivan Edouard Charles (b. 1871), Manuela Louise Consuelo Sabine (b. 1875) and René Pierre Alvaro Guy (1878–1955).

== Industrialist ==
=== 1870–1879 conventional steel ===
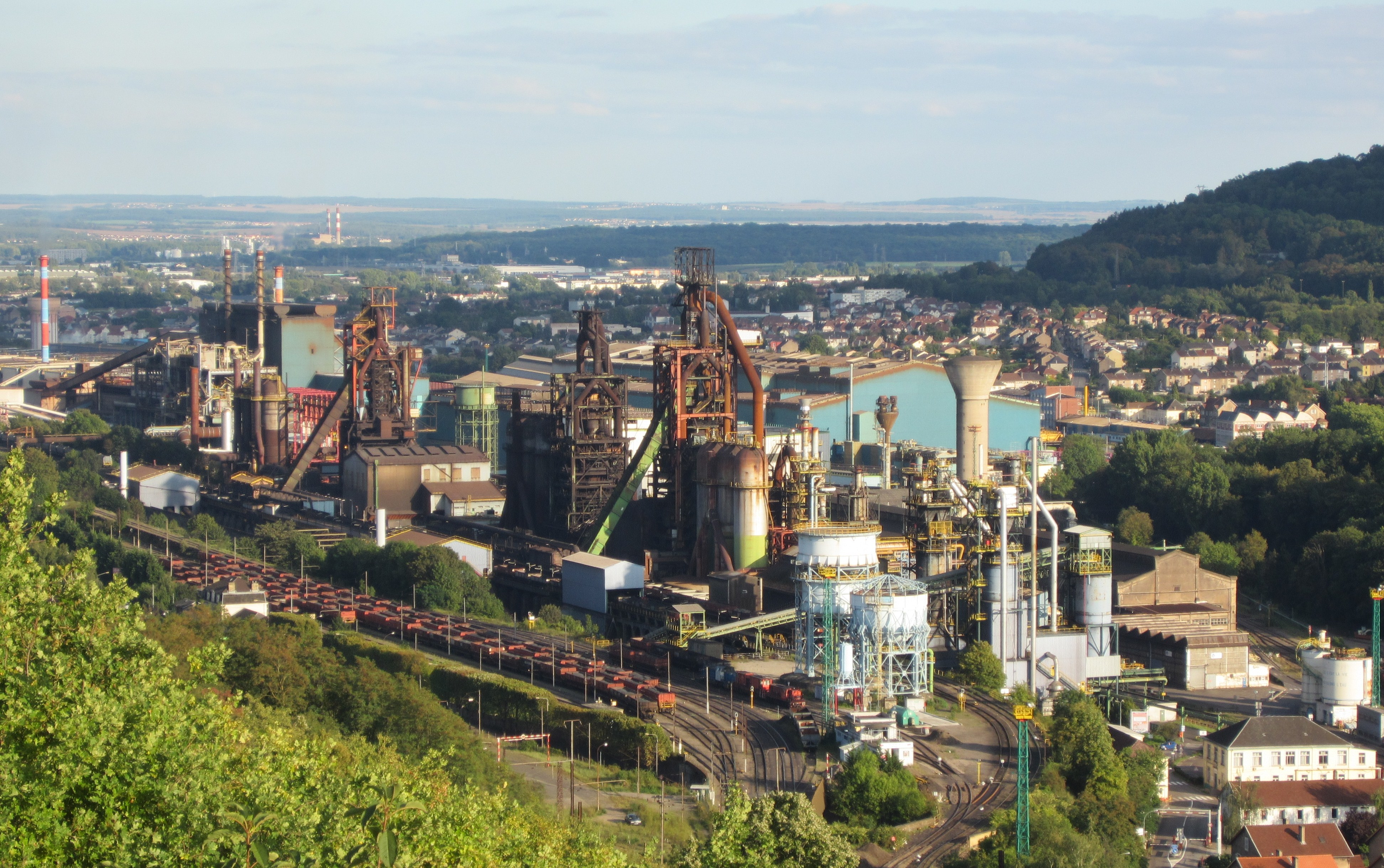
Steelworks in Hayange in 2011

When Charles de Wendel died in 1870 his 86-year old mother took charge of the firm. After the Franco-Prussian War of 1870, Lorraine was transferred from France to Germany although the border was not immediately certain. Robert de Wendel and Theodore de Gargan met Chancellor Otto von Bismarck and other German leaders in Berlin April 1871 and tried to persuade them that the Wendel works would be no use to Germany, but did not succeed. Robert de Wendel's wife appealed to French prime minister Adolphe Thiers in Paris. However, it seems that Thiers disliked the Wendels for their loyalty to the Bourbons and cooperation with Napoleon III. He thought development of the Normandy iron ore deposits would more than compensate for loss of the Lorraine deposits. He reassured parliament that "There will always be iron throughout France that is as good as in Sweden, and the prosperity of the east's metallurgic industry is a complete illusion that will not last forever." The result was that the Wendel works in Hayange, Moyeuvre and Stiring-Wendel were transferred to Germany.

On 3 December 1871 Les Petits-Fils de Francois de Wendel et Cie. (PFFW) was created as a company en commandite with 30 million francs of capital. Madame de Wendel's nine grandchildren were shareholders and three of them, Henri and Robert de Wendel and Theodore de Gargan, were géreants. Gargan and Robert de Wendel chose French citizenship, which meant they could not stay in occupied Lorraine since they were of the age of military service. Henri stayed in Hayange and thus accepted German citizenship. Henri acted as on-site director. PFFW expanded its production rapidly after the war, from 68,000 tons of iron in 1870 to 158,000 tons in 1873. A group of German and Austrian banks offered to buy a large portion of the company, but the family rejected it on sentimental grounds. "Is it fitting to abandon in this way the tombs of our ancestors? Is it very honorable in the end to leave this country, where we hae been the most esteemed representatives of the Catholic and French elements?" However, the company failed to make profits in the 1870s, since it was cut off from its former French market.

=== 1879–1903 Thomas steel ===
In 1879 Henri de Wendel obtained a sub-license for the Gilchrist Thomas process for making steel from the German licensee for 1 million reichsmarks, payable over ten years. He invested in a modern steelworks at Hayange which opened in 1881 to mass-produce steel rails and other steel products. By 1883 the Wendels were able to pay the remainder of the license fee. (Note: By 1913 the Wendel plants at Hayange and Moyeuvre were producing 847,000 tons of pig iron and 661,000 tons of steel. Wendel was one of the largest steelmakers in the German Empire, the largest in Lorraine.) The firm also acquired a new iron ore mine and ironworks at Jœuf, just over the border in France, upstream from Moyeuvre on the Orne River. Wendel et Cie was founded in 1880 as a joint venture of PFFW and Schneider et Cie, which held the French license for the Thomas process, and the Jœuf plant was converted to making Thomas steel. Eugène Schneider thought it unwise to make a heavy investment in a steelworks so close to the German border, so allowed the Wendels to take the majority stake in the new company. The first blast furnaces was fired up in Jœuf in 1882 and production of steel began in 1883, managed by Théodore de Gargan.

The Wendels were unwilling to share their monopoly sub-concession in Jœuf for the Thomas process. One effect was that the Eiffel Tower in Paris was built with cast iron rather than steel. The Aciéries de Longwy was forced to build works in the Meuse and elect Robert de Wendel to its board. In 1880 Robert de Wendel, master of forges in Hayange, Moyeuvre, Stiring-Wendel and Jœuf, ceded the license for the Gilchrist Thomas process for use by the Longwy steelworks. Some writers say the Wendels' reluctance to license the Thomas process was one of the causes of France's industrial backwardness compared to Germany, but others note that Thomas steel generally had a poor reputation. The Thomas process made very large scale metallurgy practical, even with the low-grade minette iron ores of Lorraine.

The company stopped production of products such as nails, plowshares and horseshoes, and stepped up production of steel sheets, building a new mill at Jamailles, Rosselange. Another German buyout offer in 1892 caused a storm of nationalistic protests in France, but was refused. The Wendels continued to expand their operation, including construction of a new rolling mill in Hayange in 1897. The two brothers shared an office, but Henri dealt only with technical matters and Robert looked after finance and administration. After Baron René Reille's death in 1898 Robert de Wendel was elected president of the Comité des forges after some resistance. His ownership of properties in German Lorraine raised some questions. Robert de Wendel died on 26 August 1903 in Hayange after falling from a horse.

== Legacy ==
Robert de Wendel was president of the Comité des Forges de France (CFF) and vice-president of the Union des industries et métiers de la métallurgie (UIMM) when he died. Baron Robert de Nervo became vice-president of both the CFF and the UIMM. Henri's son François de Wendel (1874–1949) was appointed manager of Les petits-fils de François de Wendel et Cie, which owned the German de Wendel properties around Hayange, and of De Wendel et Cie, which owned the French de Wendel properties around Jœuf. Robert de Wendel's son Guy de Wendel (1878–1955) was deputy for Moselle from 1919 to 1927, senator from 1927 to 1941, and from 1919 manager of the company Les petits-fils de François de Wendel et Cie.

== Sources ==
- De Wendel (France), Industry of Luxembourg
- Fraboulet, Danièle (2007), Quand les patrons s'organisent: Stratégies et pratiques de l'UIMM 1901–1950 (in French), Presses Univ. Septentrion, ISBN 978-2-85939-994-8
- "François de Wendel (1874–1949)", Annales des Mines, CGE
- James, Harold (2009-06-30), Family Capitalism: Wendels, Haniels, Falcks, and the Continental European Model, Harvard University Press, ISBN 978-0-674-03909-4
- "Le Château", Le Château Guy de Wendel, archived from the original on 2017-06-28
- Printz, Michel (20 September 2015), "Les métamorphoses du château de Wendel à Hayange", Le Républicain Lorrain (in French)
- Smith, Michael Stephen (2006), The Emergence of Modern Business Enterprise in France, 1800-1930, Harvard University Press, ISBN 978-0-674-01939-3
- "Wendel", Section Genealogique, Association Artistique de la Banque de France, archived from the original on 2016-03-03
