= Saintignon =

Saintignon coat of arms

The Saintignon family is a surviving family of the French nobility, a Lotharingian noble family from Verdun, who rose to prominence and solidified their place in the royal courts under the Ancien Régime.

An extinct branch was titled Baron of the Holy Empire in 1746. He owned a regiment in his name in the Austrian army, the Saintignon-dragons, from 1759 to 1779.

During the Industrial Revolution, the family of Saintignon invested in steel factories in Lorraine (under the name De Saintignon and Co.).

== History ==
According to tradition, Jehan Saincte came from the Verdun family of De la Porte, and is supposed to have defended Castle Viumbay successfully against Jacques de Revigny in 1293. Heavily injured, he cried out "d’Ugnon, d’Ugnon", and this cry became his name . Ancherin Sainctignon (died before 1439), alderman of Verdun, married to Jeanne Pierxel, whose son also named Ancherin, esquire, alderman of Verdun, married to Jeanne de Chauldeney, in 1498. It is this date of 1498 that Regis Valette retains in his catalog of the French nobility in the twenty-first century, as the date of the nobility of the family of Saintignon. Claude-Martin Saugrain wrote in 1726, the Saintignons were the most respected family of Verdun due to their age and numerous charitable gifts.

== Notable members ==
- Antonia Luzia of Saintignon, Abbess of Differdange
- Eric de Saintignon (1630-1699), lord at Villers-le-Preudhomme
- Johann Franz Graf von Saint-Ignon, (died 1745, wounded at Hohenfriedberg). GFWM 1738, FML 1741. Inhaber (1743-1745) of the Harrant-Kürassier Regiment.
- Karl Graf von Saint-Ignon (died 1750), GFWM 1734, FML 1739, General der Kavalerie (GdK) 1745, Inhaber (1737-1750) of the 4th Kürassier-Regiment.
- Joseph Graf von Saint-Ignon (1720-1779, son of Karl), MTO, colonel-commander of the Herzog Württemberg Dragoons (1757), wounded at Kolin, GFWM 1758, FML 1764, Inhaber (1759-1779) of the Merode Dragonerregiments.
- Johann Graf von Saintignon (1721-1763, son of Karl), MTO, served all his life in the 4th Kürassier-Regiment. Wounded at Kolin, became colonel-commander(1757), GFWM 1758, KG at Torgau 1760, died of wounds in captivity.
- Joseph de Saintignon (1716-1795), Abbot (1772-1791) of fr:Congrégation de Notre-Sauveur, involved in Estates General of 1789, juror to Civil Constitution of the Clergy 1792.
- Marie-Joseph-Maurice, comte de Saintignon (1727–1806), lord at Réding and Eich, builder of the Hôtel de Saintignon in Sarrebourg
- Fernand de Saintignon (1846–1921), iron furnace proprietor and officer of the Legion of Honour
- François de Saintignon (1912-1972), lawyer, Director of Population (Departmental Directorate of Health and Social affairs)
- Pierre de Saintignon (born 1948), French politician, vice-president of the Nord-Pas-de-Calais region (1998–2015)
- Philippe Le Jolis de Villiers de Saintignon (born 1949), French politician

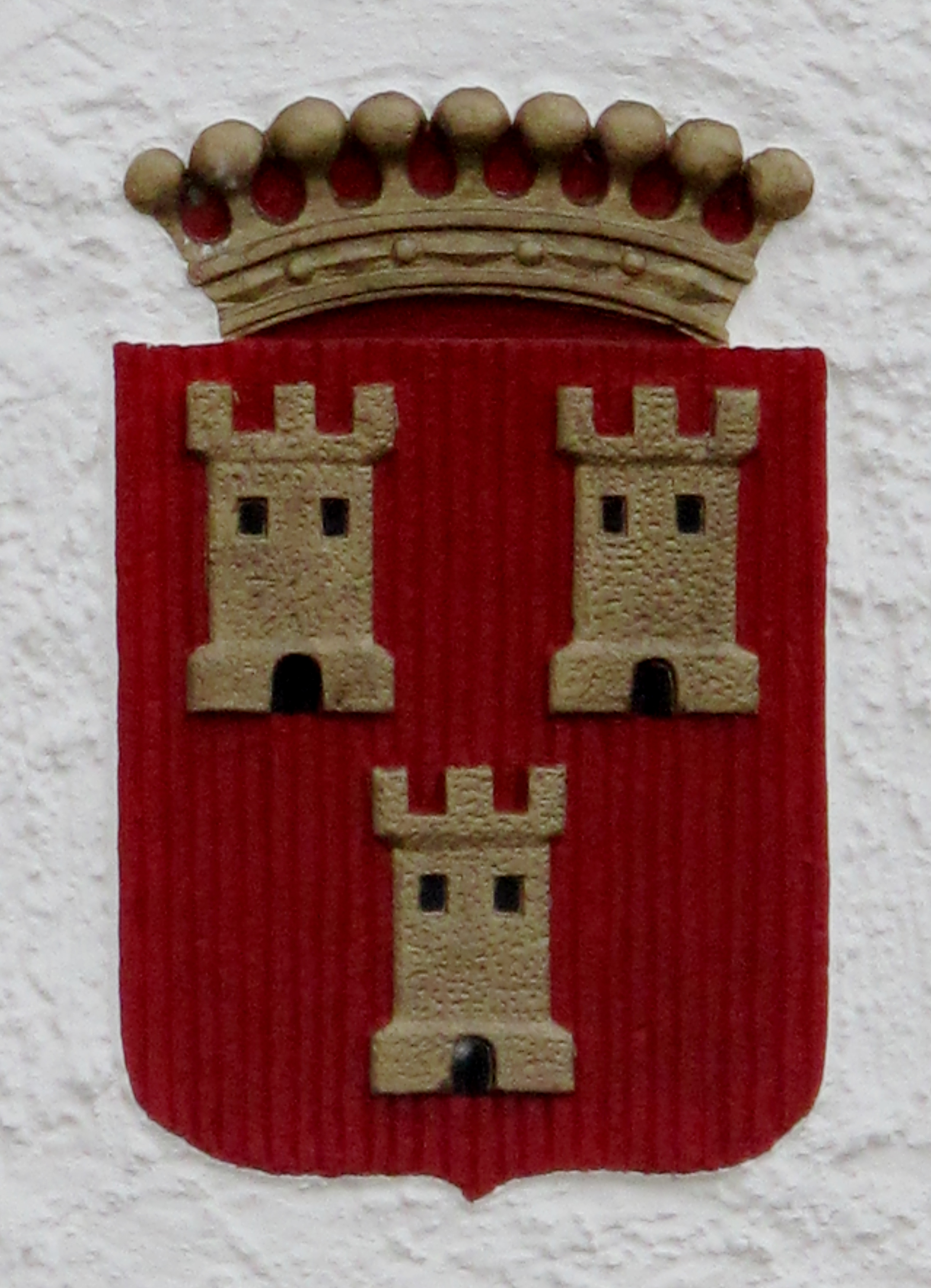
Santignon coat of arms, circa 1950
at castle Wolsfeld

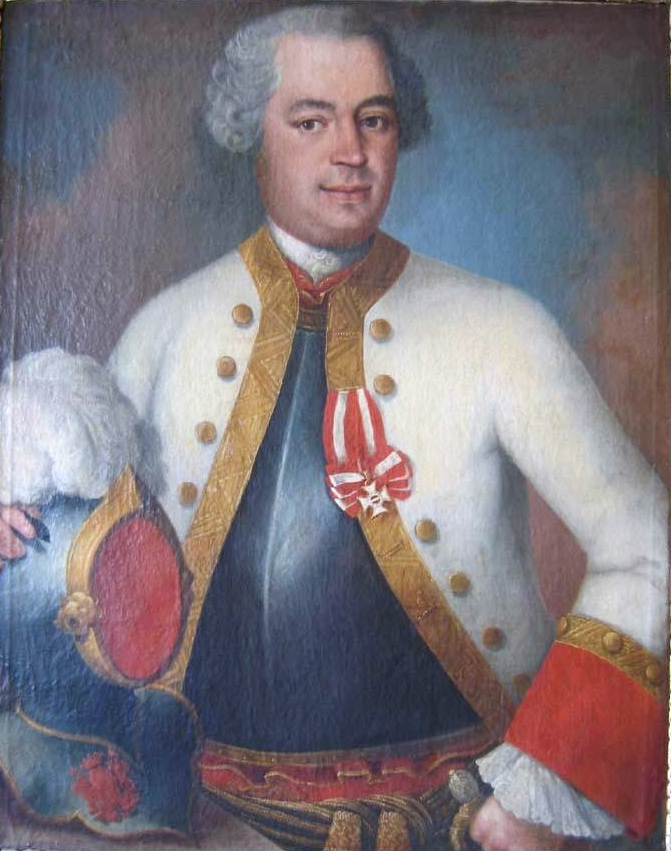
Graf Joseph
von Saint-Ignon
(1720-1779)

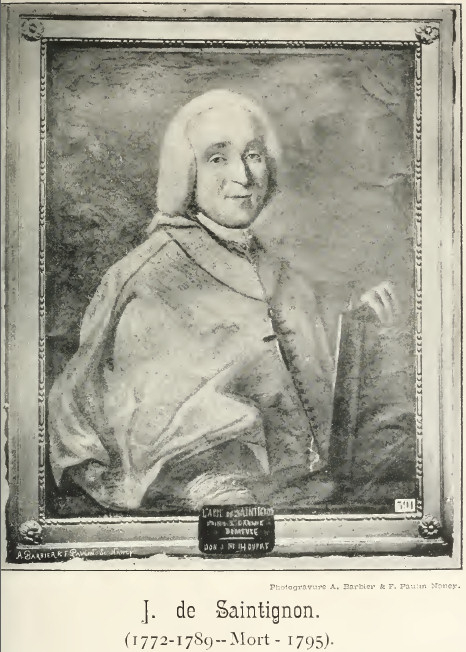
Abbott Joseph
de Saintignon
(1716-1795)

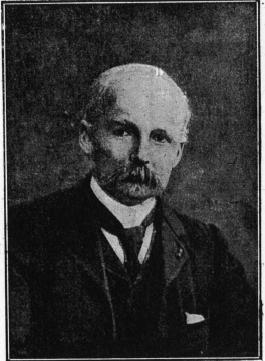
Fernand de Saintignon
(1846-1921)

== Coat of arms ==
The Coat of arms of the House De Saintignon consist of 3 castle towers in a triangular formation. Many of the estates and chateau's that belong and/or belonged to the De Saintignon's bear some variation of the coat of arms (often altered based on region, owner preference, or socio-political trends of the time). The Lotharingian communes of Hartzviller, Puxe, Vandelainville and the Rhineland-Palatinate municipality of Wolsfeld still show parts of the coats of arms of their former masters, the Saintignon family, on their local coats of arms.

== Sources ==
- L_de_M (1838). "L' Austrasie : revue du Nord-Est de la France" (in French). Verronnais (Metz). pp. 432–435 – via Bibliothèque nationale de France.
- de:Österreichisches Staatsarchiv, Abteilung Kriegsarchiv [in German]. "Kaiserliche und k.k. Generale (1618–1815)" (in German). collected by Antonio Schmidt-Brentano.
- Chatton, Abbé E. (1897). Sidot Frères (ed.). "Histoire de l'abbaye de Saint-Sauveur et de Domêvre: 1010-1789" (in French). 18 pages.
- Jérôme, Léon (1899). Berger-Levrault (Paris) (ed.). "Les élections et les cahiers du clergé lorrain aux États généraux de 1789" (in French).
- Lesprand, P.; Bour, L., eds. (1938). "Cahiers de Doléances des prévôtés bailliagères de Sarrebourg et de Phalsbourg et du bailliage de Lixheim pour les États Généraux de 1789". Collection des documents inédits sur l'histoire économique de la Révolution française (in French). Imprimerie Paul Even, Metz. p. 259.
- Wurzbach, Constant von (1874). "Biographisches Lexikon des Kaisertums Oesterreich" (in German).
