= Fernand de Saintignon =

French scientist

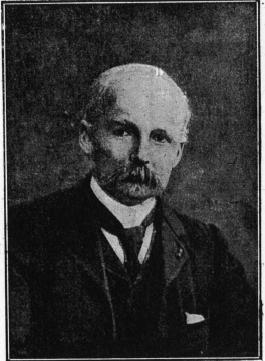
- Fernand de Saintignon on 1 January 1895
- Born: 26 January 1846; Thionville, Moselle, France
- Died: 2 January 1921 (aged 74); Longwy, France
- Occupation: Steel maker
- Known for: De Saintignon et Cie

Count Fernand de Saintignon (26 January 1846 – 2 January 1921) was a French steel maker. He was descended from an old aristocratic family, and became owner of a steel company with operations in Luxembourg and Lorraine by marriage. He was also interested in scientific subjects, and published several papers. He developed a spa around a source of pure, hot water discovered accidentally while exploring for coal deposits.

== Life ==
=== Early years ===
Fernand de Saintignon came from a family that had held the hereditary office of viscount-bailiff in Lorraine, was among the "Grands Chevaux de Lorraine", and during the 18th century was several times admitted to the Honors of the Court. The family owned several seigneuries, and had a regiment in its name, the Saintignon-dragoons, from 1759 to 1779. From the start of the 18th century the family had the title of count. A now-extinct branch was given the title of Baron of the Holy Roman Empire in 1746. In 1835 Fernand's grandfather, Charles-Joseph de Saintignon, a former officer, acquired the castle of Haute-Guentrange near Thionville, where Fernand was born. His parents were François de Saintignon (1808–57) and Caroline de Gourcy (1819–51).

Fernand de Saintignon was born on 16 January 1846 in Guentrange (now part of Thionville). In 1865 he joined the Forestry School in Nancy. During the Franco-Prussian War of 1870 he escaped from captivity twice. For his bravery in the defense of Longwy he was made a Knight of the Legion of Honour. In 1874, as a member of the General Guard and Deputy Forest Inspector at Longuyon, he obtained permission to reside at Longwy, where he married Louise Legendre. Louise Legendre (1854–1932) was daughter of Joseph Jules Legendre and Marie Giraud.

=== Steel master ===
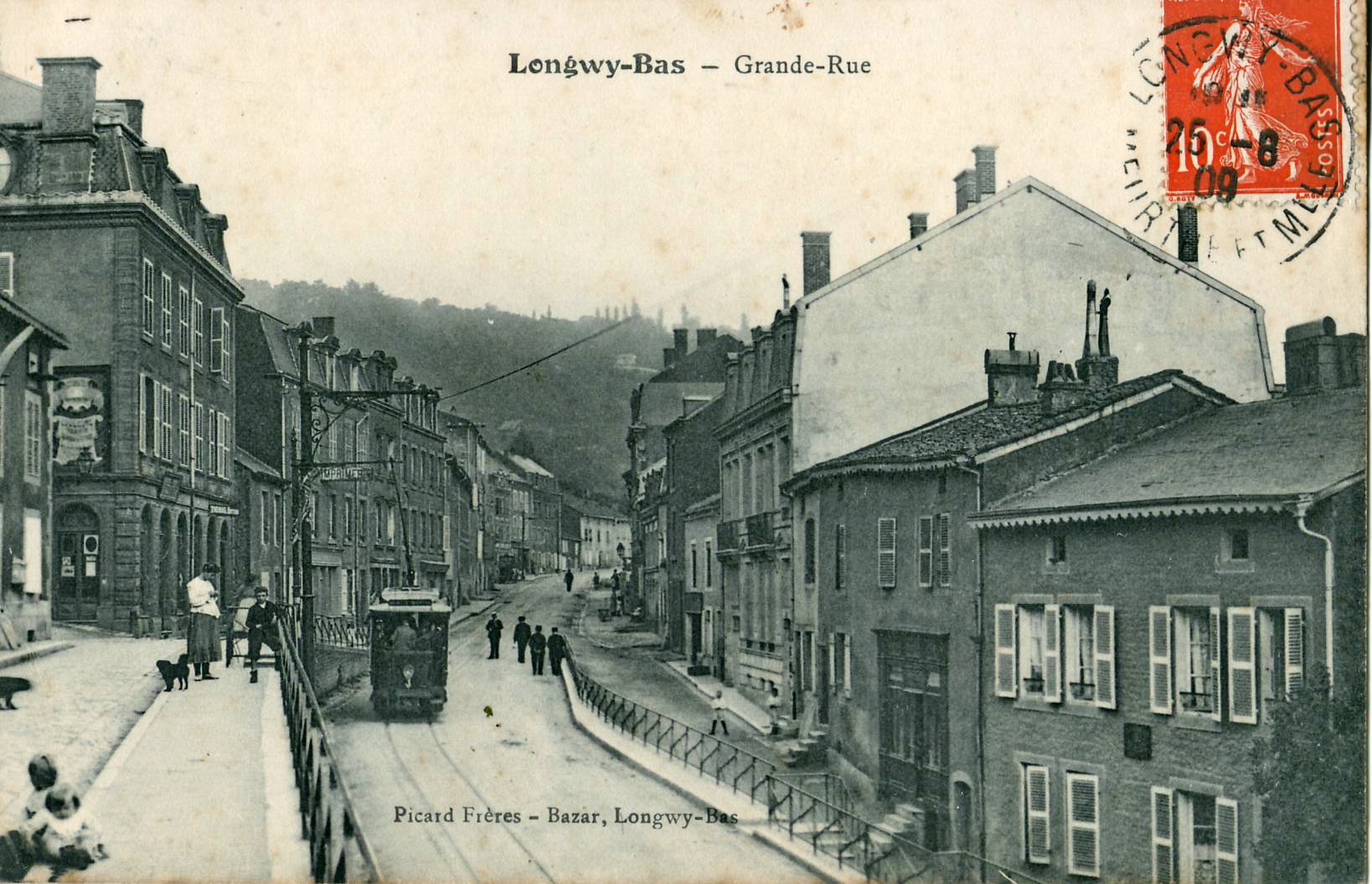
Longwy-Bas around 1909

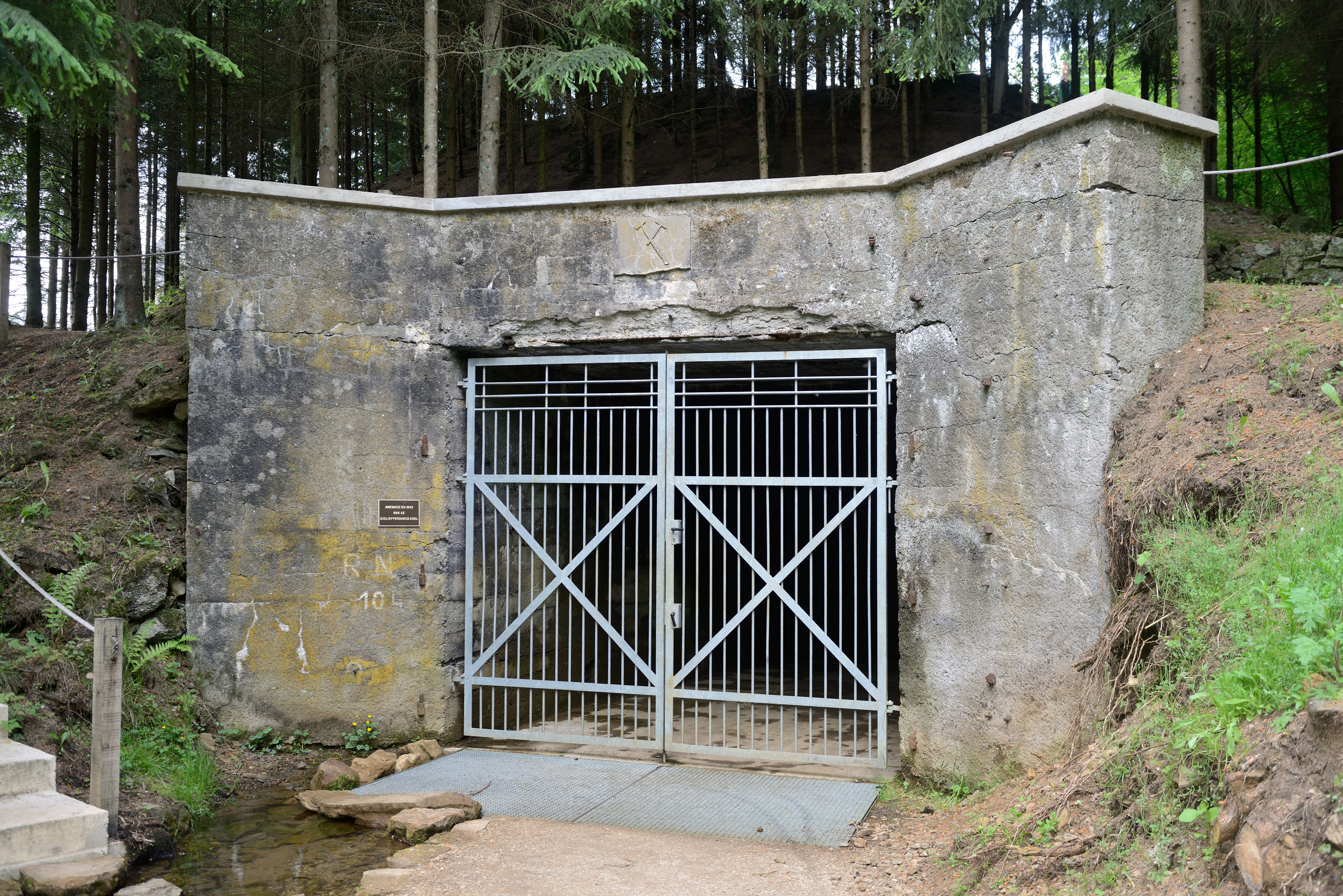
Entrance to closed mine in Lasauvage

Pierre Louis Giraud (1802–69) owned a blast furnace in Lasauvage, Luxembourg, and another in Longwy-Bas (Lower Longwy). Pierre Giraud had one child, Marguerite Mathilde Giraud, who married Jules Joseph Legendre (1830–70). Their daughter married Fernand de Saintignon. Legendre succeeded his father in law in 1869. Société Pierre Giraud was renamed the Société des Hauts-Fourneaux de Longwy et La Sauvage around this time. Legendre died in 1870 and was succeeded by Joseph Raty (1810–78), clerk-factor of the Lasauvage works, who became the proxyholder in charge of the company. When Raty died in 1878 Fernand de Saintignon took over the operation, which he would run until his death. In 1880 the company was renamed to De Saintignon et Cie.

The foundry at Lasauvage was permanently closed in 1877. However, Fernand De Saintignon had a whole village built there with a church, store and workers' housing for workers in the mines, which remained in operation until 1978.

De Saintignon's company built three modern blast furnaces in Longwy-Bas, specializing in cast iron production. In 1900 it was awarded mining concessions in the Luxembourg communes of Pétange and Differdange. In 1901 the company bought two blast furnaces in Gouraincourt. By 1913 De Saintignon et Cie had 500 workers and employees and produced 173,000 tons of cast iron annually. During World War I (1914–18) four blast furnaces were destroyed by the Germans.

=== Corporate positions ===
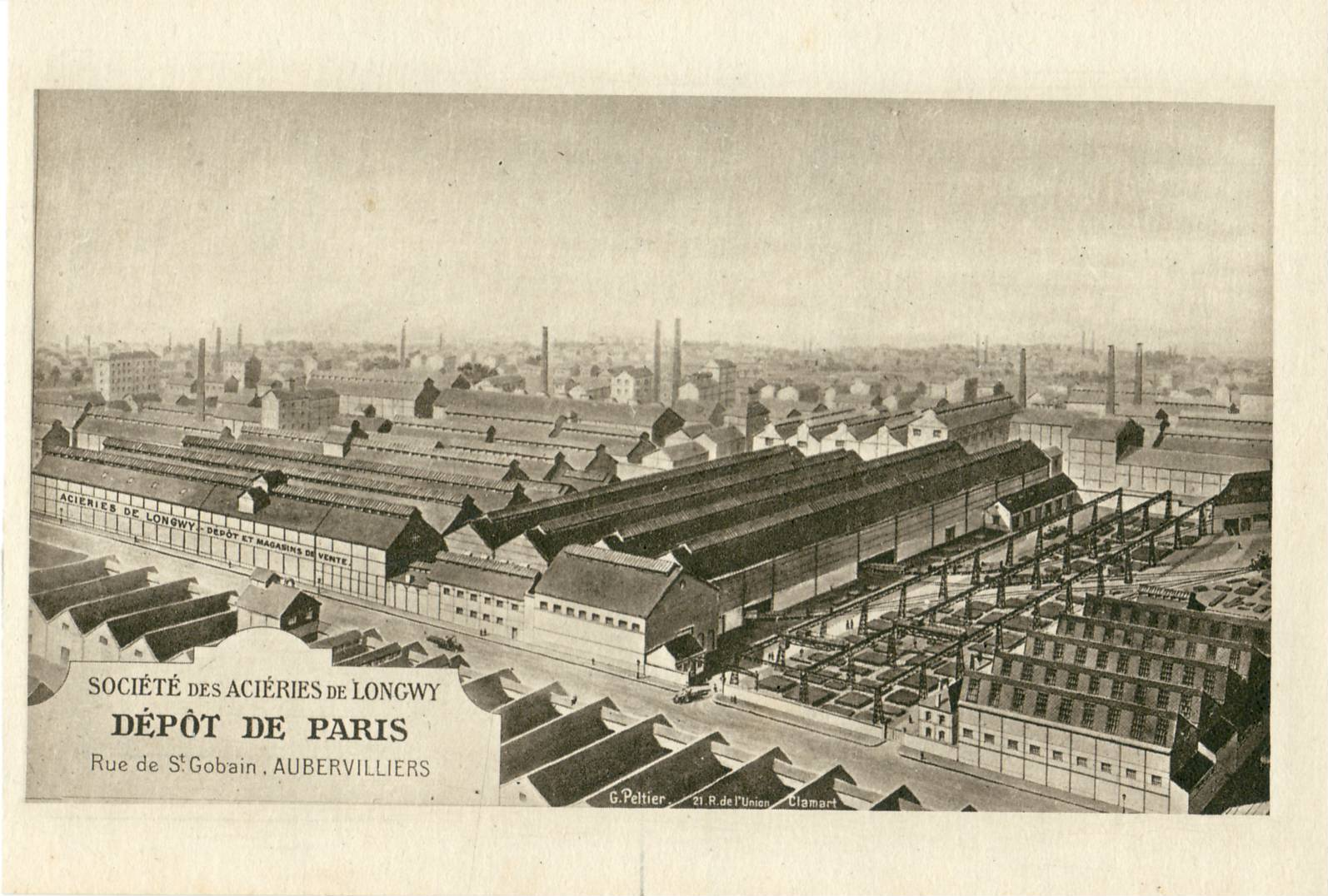
Aciéries de Longwy in Aubervilliers

The Société des Aciéries de Longwy was founded on 1 June 1880 by a merger of the Usine du Prieuré and the Usine Port-Sec in Mont-Saint-Martin. Baron Renaud Oscar d'Adelswärd (1811–98) was president and Jean-Joseph Labbé was vice-president. Members of the Aciéries de Longwy board were Baron Gustave Oscar d'Adelswärd (1843–95), Count Fernand de Saintignon, Gustave Raty, Jean-Alfred Labbé, Baron Hippolyte d'Huart, Baron Fernand d'Huart and Robert de Wendel. Fernand de Saintignon was on the management committee of the Comité des forges, the French steelmakers' association, from 1881. He was President of the Comité des Forges et Mines de Fer de Meurthe-et-Moselle, President of the Comptoir Métallurgique de Longwy, co-manager of the Société des Hauts-Fourneaux de Saulnes, Chairman of the Mines de Valleroy, Administrator of the Bank of France and Administrator of the Chemins de fer de l'Est. In 1910 Fernand de Saintignon became chairman of the Aciéries de Longwy.

=== Other activities ===
The Château de Saintignon was built in Longwy in 1883, today occupied by the police station. Behind it is a small tower that Saintignon used as an observatory. He was very curious, and published several scientific works. Fernand de Saintignon actively engaged in research into sources of iron ore. He was interested in finding a prolongation of the Saar basin, and played a role in discovery of the mines of the Pas-de-Calais.

When undertaking exploratory drilling for coal in 1907, at a depth of 353 metres (1,158 ft) a source of very pure water was found that gushes into the open air at a temperature of 24 °C (75 °F). Fernand de Saintignon decided that he would use this water for a spa. The Hotel des Récollets was built in 1912 for people seeking cures for arthritis from the water of the Récollets spring. In 1913 a physiotherapy establishment was added. The Hôtel des Curistes was inaugurated on 3 August 1914, the day before the start of World War I (1914–18), which forced the company to close. After the war an attempt was made to revive the spa between 1919 and 1921, but was abandoned due to lack of clientele.

Fernand had no children, but considered his nephew Paul as his adopted son. However, Paul died in 1919 after being released from captivity. Fernand de Saintignon died on 2 January 1921. De Saintignon & Cie was sold after his death to the Société des Hauts Fourneaux de la Chiers.

== Publications ==
Publications included:

- Fernand de Saintignon (1885), Pyromètres à courant d'eau... Systèmes F. de Saintignon, avec ou sans l'explorateur Boulier frères. Ses applications... en général à toutes les industries faisant usage des hautes températures, Paris: Société anonyme des pyromètres à courant d'eau, p. 26
- Fernand de Saintignon (1892), Le Mouvement différentiel. Loi des marées, eau, air, feu, Paris: Berger-Levrault, p. 56
- Fernand de Saintignon (1894), Nouvelle théorie des marées. Le Mouvement différentie, Paris: Berger-Levrault, p. 121
- Fernand de Saintignon (1895), Nouvelle théorie des marées. Le Mouvement différentiel, Paris: Berger-Levrault, p. 127
- Fernand de Saintignon (1896), Notice sur la nouvelle théorie des marées. Le Mouvement différentiel, Nancy: Berger-Levrault, p. 4
- Fernand de Saintignon (1903), Sur les tremblements de terre, pressions différentielles dans les fluides: conférence faite à Nancy, le 3 juillet 1902, Paris: Berger-Levrault, p. 60
- Fernand de Saintignon (1905), Le Radium et l'attraction différentielle à petite distance dans les fluides, par F. de Saintignon,..., Paris: Berger-Levrault, p. 36
- Fernand de Saintignon (1906), Sur le mouvement des astres; le double renflement équatorial, Paris: Berger-Levrault

== Sources ==
- "Aciéries de Longwy", industrie.lu – D'Industriegeschicht vu Lëtzebuerg (in French)
- Bouzendorffer, Charles, Fernand de Saintignon (in French)
- "de Saintignon au Luxembourg et environs", industrie.lu (in French)
- Fernand de Saintignon (1846–1921) (in French), BnF: Bibliotheque nationale de France
- Forges (Comité des) (in French), Patrons de France
- Garric, Alain, "M Marguerite Mathilde GIRAUD", Geneanet (in French)
- Guillet, L. (April 1921), "Notice Biographique : Comte Fernand de Saintignon" (PDF), Revue de la métallurgie (in French), no. 4
- Joly, Hervé (2008), Diriger une grande entreprise française au XXe siècle : modes de gouvernance, trajectoires et recrutement. (PDF) (in French), Ecole des Hautes Etudes en Sciences Sociales (EHESS)
- Kovacs, Stéphanie (19 June 2012), Relations entre maîtres de forges, autorités communales et gouvernementales au Grand-Duché de Luxembourg, de 1850-1914 – une étude de cas : Differdange et Dudelange (PDF) (thesis) (in French), Université du Luxembourg
- Le Savoir ... Fer : Glossaire du H.F. (PDF) (in French) (5 ed.), Association Le Savoir ... Fer
- "L'usine du comte de Saintignon et ses vestiges au cœur de la ville", Le Républicain Lorrain (in French), 26 September 2010
- "Un vicomte comme président de la région Nord-Pas-de-Calais-Picardie ?", Hauts de France Media (in French), 18 September 2015
- "Usine de Saintignon", industrie.lu (in French)
