= Lasauvage =

Coordinates: 49°31′N 5°50′E

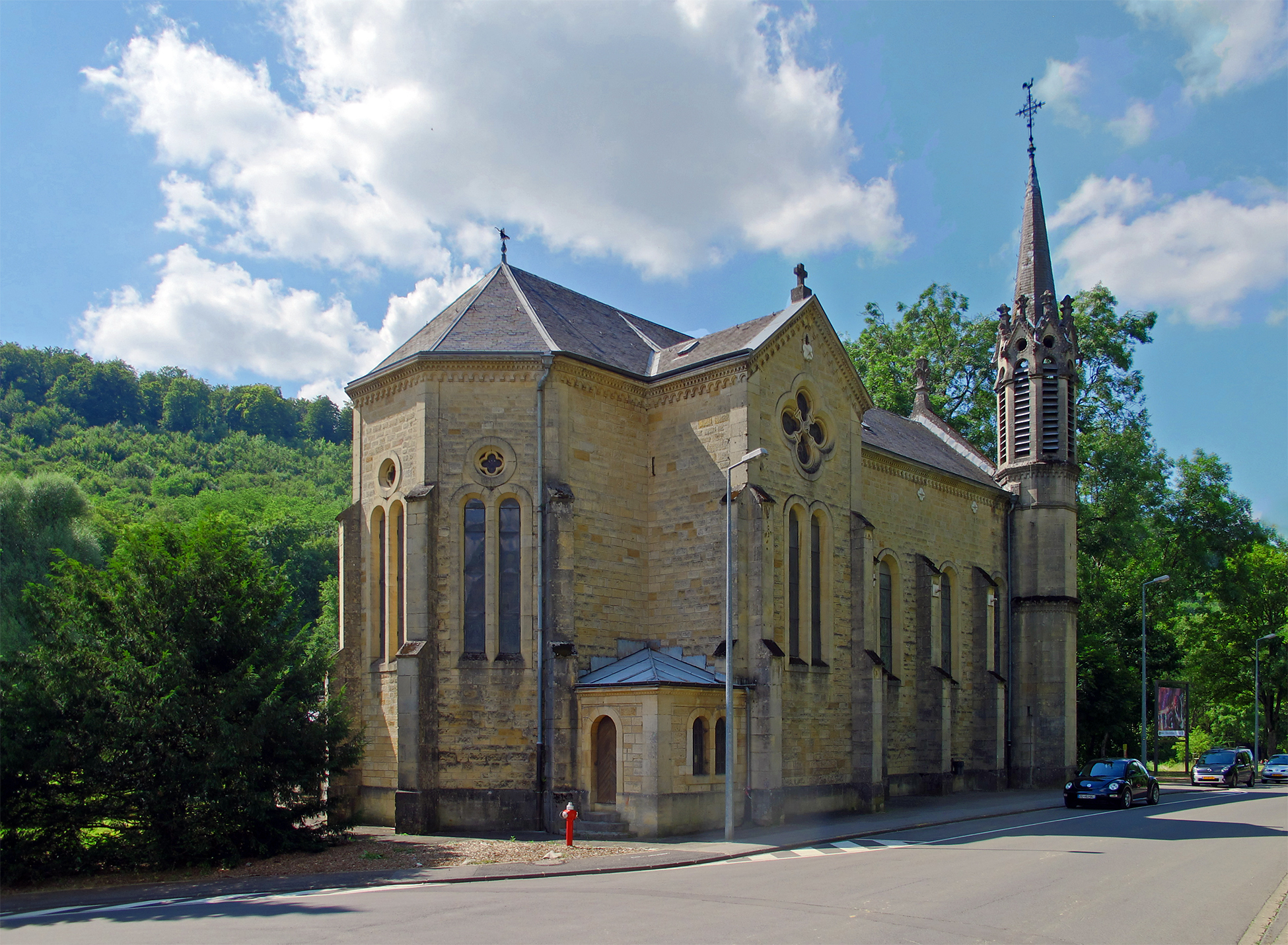
Church of Lasauvage, modeled on the Saint-Esprit church in Paris

Lasauvage (French pronunciation: [lasovaʒ]; Luxembourgish: Zowaasch) (German: — notionally only — Rohrbach) is a small town in the commune of Differdange, in south-western Luxembourg.

Lasauvage was known as one of the few French-speaking towns in an otherwise Luxembourgish-speaking country. Unlike many German alternatives to place names in Luxembourg, Lasauvage's German equivalent, Rohrbach, has been little-used because of its perceived Nazi associations.

Shortly before the Second World War, there were plans drawn up by the Luxembourg government for Grand Duchess Charlotte to reside in Lasauvage, given its proximity to France, which would enable her to escape over the border easily, but they did not come to fruition.

== Population ==
As of September 2026, the town has a population of 458.

== Name ==
The place name goes back to a legend of a wild woman, who is supposed to have only eaten raw meat and who lived under a rocky promontory, where she was buried by a landslide. It is assumed that the valley was not inhabited before the 17th century. In early chronicles, it is referred to as Val de la sauvage femme (French for "Valley of the wild woman").

== History ==
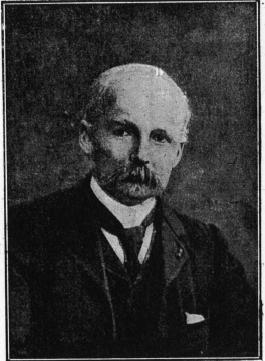
Count Fernand de Saintignon, who financed the construction of many houses and public buildings in Lasauvage

Around the year 1623 in the Valley of the Wild Woman, a water-powered hammerworks with blast furnace was erected, where the primary school is now, owned by the Longwy citizen, Gabriel Bernard. The small works had a turbulent history. As early as the 16th century, a smithy with water-powered hammerworks existed in Lasauvage at the river "La Croisière". The highly ferrous surface ore was collected from fields. It was melted down using charcoal, taken from the surrounding forest. The works had a turbulent history and belonged, amongst others, to the families d'Huart and Giraud. By marriage, in the late 19th century Count Fernand de Saintignon took over the reins of the "Société des Hauts-Fourneaux de Longwy et de La Sauvage -- F de Saintignon et Cie". With him, the high point as well as the beginning of the decline of the Lasauvage works start. At this point, it had a population of 1,000.

There were also times in which Lasauvage was booming. An example of this would be the residential house, which belonged to the furnaces and was expanded into a stately home by Count de Saintignon. In the course of the years, two further blast furnaces were added. The Lasauvage metalworks was the first one the country to process Minette (low-quality iron ore from the South of Luxembourg), in addition to the more usual surface iron ore.

Around 1877, the works had to close. The pressure from the competition had grown too great, and Lasauvage was in an isolated area. Later plans to segue from iron ore processing into mining coal, were not met with success. Exporatory drilling discovered water instead of coal. The Count of Saintignon therefore had the idea to turn Lasauvage into a spa area. This also was fruitless.

In 1880, de Saintignon started building accommodation for his workers. Around 70 workers' houses were built on the Rue Principale, the Place de Saintignon, the Rue de Rodange, and the Rue de la Crosnière. These houses were built in a uniform style, with three rooms and a kitchen. They were built in the style of the nearby Lotharingian workers' houses, which were called corons. De Saintignon also constructed a school on the place of former blast furnaces, and a church, inspired by the Sainte-Chapelle in Paris. In the Economat (opposite the school), the workers could buy groceries, and have their bill (like their rent payments) deducted from their wages.

Saintignon also built a church and a vicarage, which was given to the commune of Differdange after his death by his heirs. The school, on the other hand, was sold to the commune.

During World War I, mining of the Minette ore was stopped by Saintignon, as he refused to deliver ore to the Germans, who were in control of the furnaces of Differdange. After the war and the death of the impoverished Saintignon, the metalworks of Rodange bought the houses and continued to mine Minette, until in 1978 the last mine was closed.

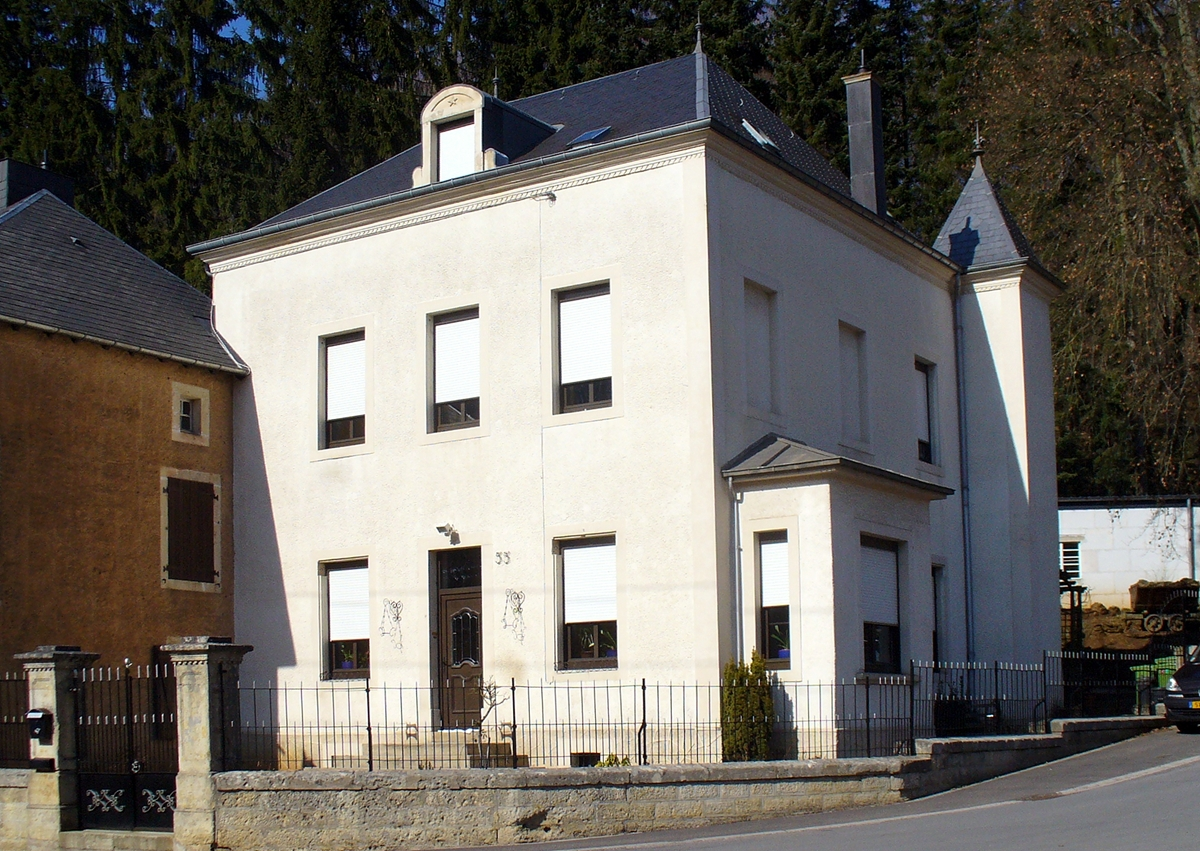
House No. 55

As Lasauvage was the only Luxembourgish village in range of the guns of the Maginot Line, the Grand-Ducal family had had a casemate build under House number 55 from 1939 to 1940. Grand Duchess Charlotte was to live here in case of a German invasion, and continue to rule the country from here, like Albert I of Belgium, who during World War I had withdraw behind the Yser line. But, when the German invasion did come on 10 May 1940, events moved so quickly that the Grand Duchess only barely had time to escape to France, and House No. 55 in Lasauvage was never used.

Until 1905, as Lasauvage had no graveyard, its inhabitants were buried at Saulnes (Lux.: Zounen), its French neighbouring village. In 1907 the Count of Saintignon built a cemetery, but on the French side of the border: his mostly French employees and workers were to be buried in France. The cross-border burials, however, led to some administrative problems. Until 1980, a French customs officer had to be present at burials.

== Mining museum ==
The Eugène Pesch Museum, a collection which specializes in local history and mining, is located in the village.
