= Jean Plichon =

French industrialist and politician (1863–1936)

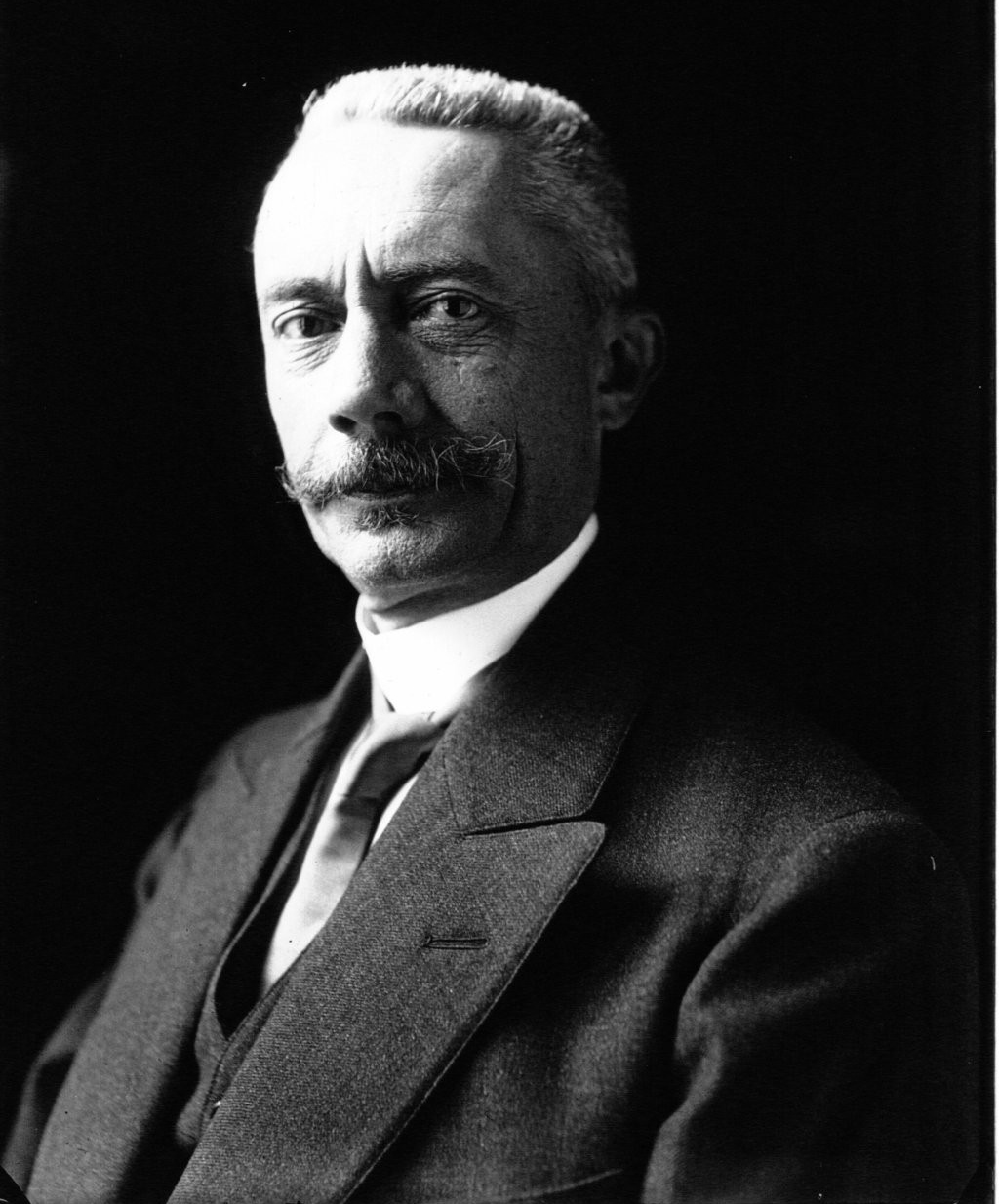
- Jean Plichon in 1913

Deputy for Nord
- In office 22 September 1889 – 20 January 1920

Senator for Nord
- In office 20 January 1920 – 5 January 1924

Deputy for Nord
- In office 11 May 1924 – 31 May 1936

Personal details
- Born: Jean Ignace Alexis Winoc Plichon; 14 June 1863 Bailleul, Nord, France
- Died: 22 September 1936 (aged 73) Oxelaëre, Nord, France
- Education: École Centrale Paris
- Occupation: Industrialist and politician

Jean Plichon (14 June 1863 – 22 September 1936) was a French industrialist and politician. He trained as a mining engineer. When his father died in 1888 he inherited the presidency of the Bethune mining company and also replaced his father as deputy for the Nord department. He remained head of the Bethune mining company and a member of the legislature or senate for most of the remainder of his life. He advocated protectionist policies throughout his career.

== Early years (1863–88) ==
Jean Ignace Alexis Winoc Plichon was born on 14 June 1863 in Bailleul, Nord. He came from a well-established bourgeois family of French Westhoek. He was the son of Charles Ignace Plichon (1814–88) and Marie Constance Boitelle (1840–94), and brother of Pierre Plichon (1865–1936). His mother was the daughter of Alexis Boitelle, one of the main founders of the coal industry in the Nord department. His father was seen as the representative of the four interrelated landholding dynasties in the region collectively known as "la grande famille." His father was Deputy for Nord from 1857 to 1870, Minister of Public Works in 1870 and Deputy for Nord from 1871 until his death in 1888, and was a supporter of Albert, 4th duc de Broglie. After completing his secondary education Jean Plichon attended the École centrale des arts et manufactures of Paris, graduating in 1886 in 3rd place. He then became an engineer at the Compagnie des mines de Béthune.

== Prewar deputy and industrialist (1888–1914) ==
After the death of his father in 1888, Plichon replaced him as a member of the General Council of the |Nord department, representing Bailleul. In the 22 September 1889 legislative elections he was elected in the first round for the 2nd constituency of Hazebrouck, Nord as a monarchist candidate. During the election he said, "Christian, I am the defender of religious principles, without which there can be no barrier to the progress of the Revolution. Catholic, I will find myself constantly struggling with those followers of Gambetta who scream, 'Clericalism, behold the enemy!'." Plichon sat on the right, but soon joined the Republicans.

On 31 March 1891 in Wavrechain-sous-Denain Jean Plichon married Jeanne Leduc (1870–1940). Their children were Geneviève (1893–1989), Marguerite, Adeline and Christiane (1900–80). His wife's sister Marthe was the wife of Paul Dussaussoy (1860–1909), right-wing deputy of the Pas-de-Calais and the son, grandson and great-grandson of a deputy. Two of Plichon's children married into the Thiriez family, well-known textile manufacturers of the Nord.

Plichon succeeded his father as an administrator of the Compagnie des mines de Béthune. He became one of the leading industrialists of northern France, president of the Béthune, Blanzy and Sainte-Thérèse mining companies. He sat on the boards of industrial and banking concerns such as Mines de Kali Sainte-Thérèse, Forges de Denain-Anzin, Crédit Industriel et Commercial, Banque Scalbert and Compagnie électrique du Nord-Ouest. This gave him considerable authority in the chamber on questions of economic and financial affairs. Plichon was reelected Deputy for Nord on 20 August 1893, 8 May 1898, 27 April 1902, 6 May 1906, 24 April 1910, 26 April 1914 and 16 November 1919. Throughout his parliamentary career he was a protectionist. He played an important role in the Méline commission in 1892, which implemented protective duties for wheat producers.

In 1900 Émile Deshayes de Marcère was President of the Mines de Béthune, while Jean Plichon was secretary of the management council. Later the presidency returned to Jean Plichon, who also dominated the mines of Blanzy and Kali Sainte-Thérèse. In the early 20th century Plichon succeeded Léon Renard (1836–1916) as vice-president of the Comité Central des Houillères de France (Central Committee of French Coal Mine Owners).

== World War I (1914–18) ==
In 1914, despite being 51 years old Plichon joined the army. He was awarded the Legion of Honour and the Croix de Guerre, and reached the rank of lieutenant-colonel. His house at Bailleul was destroyed in the war, and from 1918 he lived at Oxelaere.

== Postwar career (1918–36) ==
Plichon gave up his seat in the chamber and was elected Senator for Nord from 11 January 1920 to 5 January 1924. In the senate he often intervened in favor of support for his region of France, which had been devastated by the war. In 1922 his report on the world economic situation advocated protection of French production from foreign competition. In 1924 Jean Plichon was still president of the Compagnie des mines de Béthune and Louis Mercier was still director-general. In 1924 Plichon resigned as senator in order to run again for election as a Deputy for Nord. Plichon was among the Catholic industrialists who were well-represented in the Republican Federation (Fédération républicaine), others being François de Wendel, Guy de Wendel and Pierre Amidieu du Clos. Plichon was elected deputy for Nord on 11 May 1924, 22 April 1928 and 8 May 1932, leaving office on 31 May 1936.

Jean Plichon died on 22 September 1936 in Oxelaëre, Nord. For industries like metallurgy and coal mining, only a limited company can manage the huge amounts of capital investment required. However, the Bethune mines had become a fief of the Plichons, since Jean was succeeded by his brother Pierre and nephew Jean-Pierre Plichon. Men such as the Plichons, although they did not belong to the rich industrial bourgeoisie, were able to build great fortunes due to their political and technical skills.

== Publications ==
Plichon published numerous speeches, proposals for laws and parliamentary reports. Other publications include:

- Jean Plichon (1890), La Situation des ouvriers mineurs en France et à l'étranger, Paris: Impr. de la Société de typographie, p. 76

== Sources ==
- Base collaborative Pierfit, "Jean PLICHON", geneanet (in French)
- Baycroft, Timothy (2004), Culture, Identity and Nationalism: French Flanders in the Nineteenth and Twentieth Centuries, Boydell & Brewer, ISBN 978-0-86193-269-6
- Bertrand, Alphonse (1893), "PLICHON (Jean)", La Chambre de 1893: biographies des 581 députés (in French), chez Quantin
- Emerit, Marcel (1974), "Du saint-simonisme au catholicisme : Ignace Plichon, député du Nord", Revue du Nord (in French), 56 (220)
- Jean, Ignace, Alexis, Winoc Plichon (in French), Assemblée nationale
- Jolly, Jean (1977), "PLICHON (JEAN, IGNACE, ALEXIS, WINOC)", Dictionnaire des Parlementaires français (in French)
- Jean Plichon (1863-1936) (in French), BnF: Bibliotheque nationale de France
- "Monument aux morts des personnels des mines de Béthune", Mémoires de Pierre (in French)
- Passmore, Kevin (2013), The Right in France from the Third Republic to Vichy, OUP Oxford, ISBN 978-0-19-965820-6
- Przybyla, Francis (2007-08-07), Le Blé, le sucre et le charbon: Les parlementaires du Nord et leur action 1881-1889 (in French), Presses Univ. Septentrion, ISBN 978-2-85939-980-1
