= Jérôme David =

Baron Jérôme David LH ADC
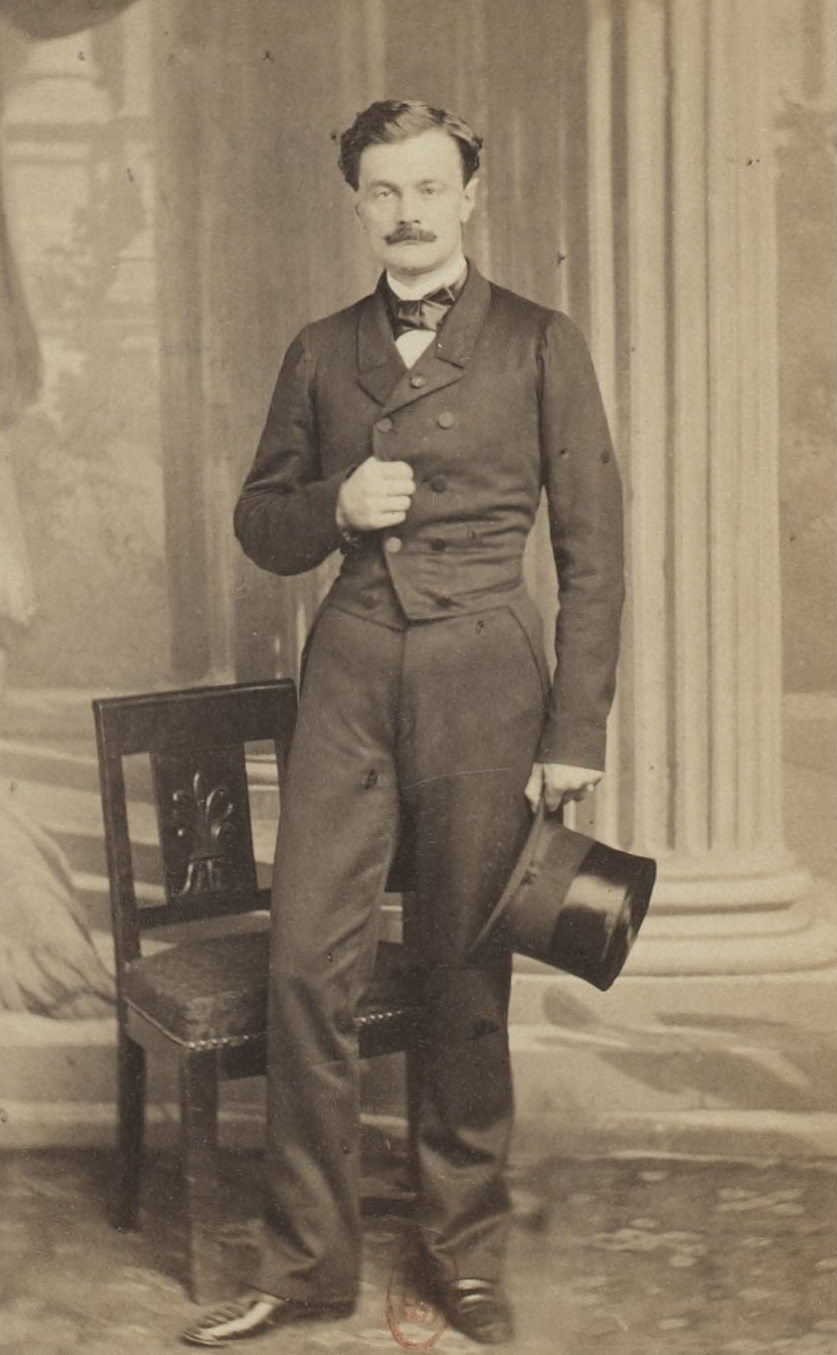
- Photograph from the Album des députés au Corps législatif entre 1852–1857

Deputy for Gironde
- In office 1 May 1859 – 4 September 1870

Minister of Public Works
- In office 10 August 1870 – 4 September 1870
- Preceded by: Charles Ignace Plichon

Deputy for Gironde
- In office 5 March 1876 – 27 October 1881

Personal details
- Born: 30 June 1823 Rome, Lazio, Kingdom of Italy
- Died: 27 January 1882 (aged 58) Langon, Gironde, France
- Occupation: Politician, Journalist & officer

Jérôme Frédéric Paul, baron David (30 June 1823 – 27 January 1882) was the reputed illegitimate son of Jérôme Bonaparte. Throughout his life, he served France in a number of capacities such as politician and officer. He was also a journalist.

He served as an aide-de-camp in the army in Algeria and the Crimea, then entered politics and was a member of the Corps législatif during the Second French Empire. He was briefly Minister of Public Works at the outbreak of the Franco-Prussian War of 1870.

== Early years ==
Jérôme David was born in Rome, Italy, on 30 June 1823, nominal grandson of the painter Jacques-Louis David, and godson of Jérôme Bonaparte, King of Westphalia and Catharina of Württemberg, his wife. He was rumoured to be the natural son of King Jérôme. His family destined him for the navy, where he served from 1835 to 1837, but he took a dislike to this service and chose to join the army instead. He graduated from the École de Saint-Cyr on 1 October 1844 as second lieutenant of the Zouaves.

David was in turn an aide to General Louis-Eugène Cavaignac, head of the bureau arabe at Lalla Maghnia on the Moroccan frontier, aide to General Paul de Ladmirault, aide to General Jacques Louis Randon the governor-general of Algeria, and finally commanding officer of the Beni-Massour circle in Kabylie. In 1853 he married Jeanne Cécile Elisa Merle, of Langon, Gironde, ex-wife of Mr. Despiet, a Bordeaux notary. In 1853–55 he was an aide to his reputed brother, Prince Napoléon Bonaparte, whom he followed in the Crimean War. David was made a captain of the 21st line regiment in 1854. He returned with the prince to France when the prince's physical and moral condition no longer allowed him to stay with the army. He resigned from the army in 1857.

== Political career ==
=== Second French Empire ===
In 1854, David was elected Mayor of Langon and general councilor of the Gironde for the canton of Saint-Symphorien. He ran for election to the legislature for the 3rd constituency of Gironde on 22 June 1857 but was defeated. He ran again on 1 May 1859, for the 4th constituency of Gironde, La Réole, and was elected. He would be reelected to his seat in 1863.

David was made a Commander of the Legion of Honor in August 1864 and Grand Officer on 19 June 1869. David was reelected for the 6th constituency of Gironde on 24 May 1869.

David sat with the dynastic majority, where he distinguished himself as an outspoken conservative and Bonapartist in debates. He spoke in favour of free trade on the eve of the Treaty of Commerce with England.

The Emperor Napoleon III appointed David Vice-president of the Corps législatif for the sessions of 1867, 1868 and 1869. When he was reappointed vice-president in June 1869, this was seen as a promise to the reactionary party, and President Eugène Schneider submitted his resignation. Schneider agreed to remain only at the personal request of the emperor.

David opposed the ministry of Émile Ollivier. He spoke against the Hohenzolern candidacy for the Spanish throne, and was one of the strongest supporters of the declaration of war against Prussia in 1870. After the Ollivier cabinet fell on 10 August 1870, he was made Minister of Public Works in the Palikao cabinet.

David announced the defeat at the Battle of Sedan to the Senate, and declared "Paris will not capitulate, and, if necessary, we will be buried under its ruins." The next day, on 4 September 1870, he returned to private life.

=== French Third Republic ===
After a short exile in Great Britain in which he was one of the main correspondents of Louis-Napoleon, David attempted to return to politics.

On 2 July 1871, he ran for reelection as deputy for the Gironde but was defeated. Strongly affected by the deaths of his two children in 1872 and 1874, and then by the death of Louis Napoleon, he seemed tempted to abandon politics. However, on 6 October 1874 he was elected to the general council for the canton of Langon. He was reelected to Parliament for Bazas on 5 March 1876, after a campaign based on defending the achievements of the Empire and denouncing the Republic. He sat with the Appel au peuple group. He supported Albert de Broglie against the 363.

David was beaten in Langon in the municipal elections of February 1877. He was reelected as deputy as an official candidate on 18 October 1877. The Republican majority invalidated this election, but he was reelected on 7 July 1878 and continued to vote with the Bonapartists. He gave up the political struggle after the death of the Prince Imperial. He did not defend his seat in the cantonal elections of 1880 or the legislative elections of 1881. He died on 27 January 1882 in Langon. His entire fortune was a house, valued at 15,000 francs.

== Publications ==
- Jérôme David (1857), Le Bien d'autrui, comédie en 1 acte et en prose, Paris: J. Claye, p. 36
- Jérôme David (1858), La Revanche du mari, comédie en 2 actes et en prose, Bordeaux: impr. de G. Gounouilhou, p. 60
- Jérôme David (1862), Réflexions et discours sur la propriété chez les Arabes, Bordeaux: impr. de Gounouilhou, p. 71
- Jérôme David (1874), Actualités et souvenirs politiques, Paris: Amyot, p. 61

== Sources ==
- Cooper, Thompson (1872), Men of the Time: A Dictionary of Contemporaries, G. Routledge and sons
- Dubos, Joël (1998), "DAVID Jérôme", Dictionnaire des parlementaires d'Aquitaine sous la Troisième République (in French), Presses Univ de Bordeaux, ISBN 978-2-86781-231-6
- Lauzac, Henry (1859), Galerie historique et critique du dix-neuvième siècle, Au bureau de la Galerie historique
- Robert, Adolphe; Cougny, Gaston (1889), "David (Jérôme, Frédéric, Paul)", Dictionnaire des parlementaires français de 1789 à 1889 (in French)
- Rüstow, Wilhelm (1871), Guerre des frontières du Rhin 1870-1871, J. Dumaine
