= Souhey =

- Commune
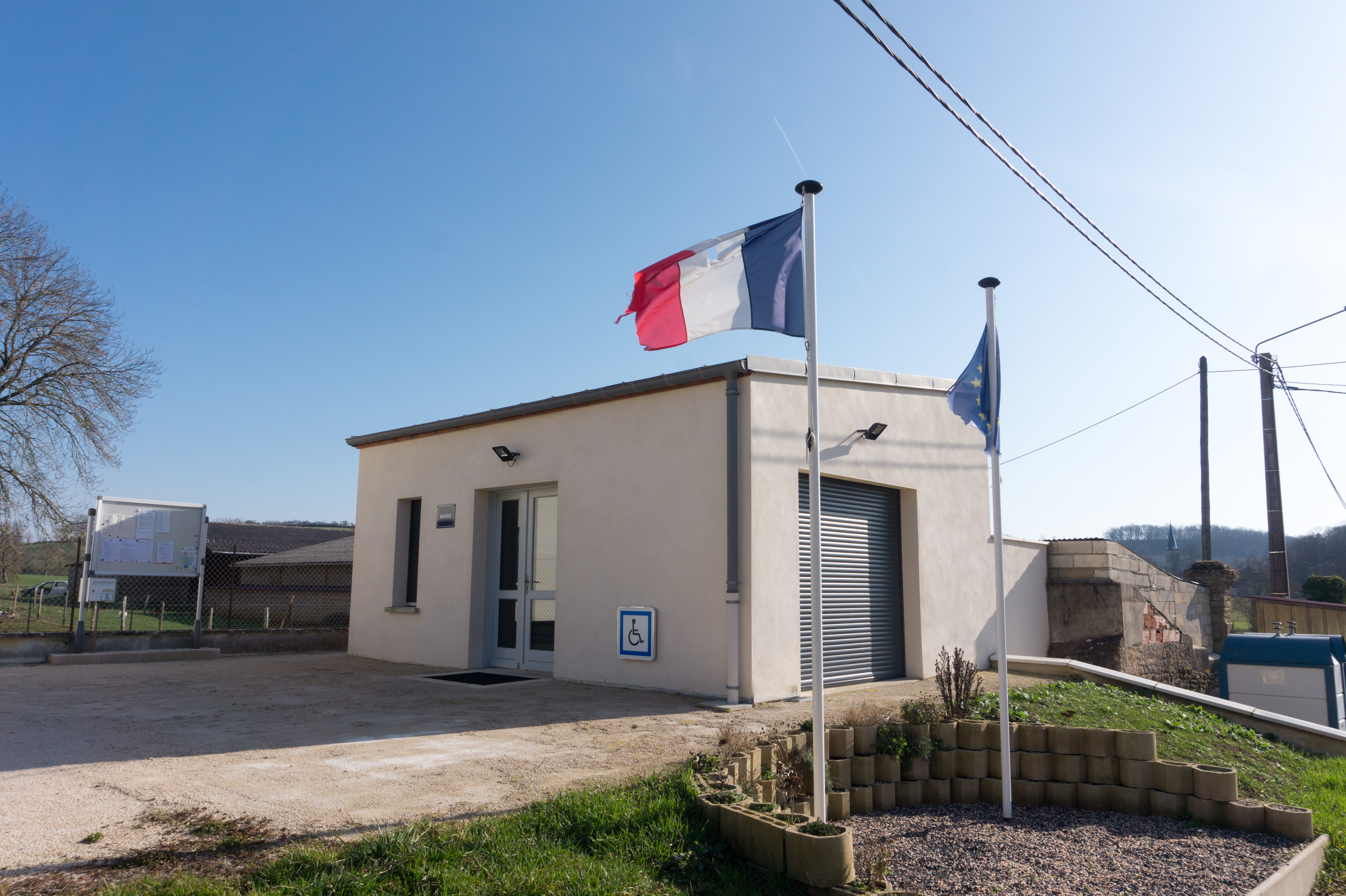
- Town hall
- Location of Souhey
- Location within France Location within Bourgogne-Franche-Comté
- Coordinates: 47°29′09″N 4°25′10″E
- Country: France
- Region: Bourgogne-Franche-Comté
- Department: Côte-d'Or
- Arrondissement: Montbard
- Canton: Semur-en-Auxois

Government
  - Mayor (2020–2026): François Bourgeois
- Area^{1}: 2.77 km^{2} (1.07 sq mi)
- Elevation: 350 m (1,150 ft)
- Highest elevation: 429 m (1,407 ft)
- Lowest elevation: 298 m (978 ft)
- Population (2023): 82
  - Density: 30/km^{2} (77/sq mi)
- Time zone: UTC+01:00 (CET)
  - Summer (DST): UTC+02:00 (CEST)
- INSEE/Postal code: 21612 /21140
- ^{1} French Land Register data, which excludes lakes, ponds, glaciers > 1 km^{2} (0.386 sq mi or 247 acres) and river estuaries.

Souhey (French pronunciation: [su.ɛ]) is a commune in the Côte-d'Or department in eastern France.

== Population ==
Historical population
Year	Pop.	±% p.a.
1968	38	—
1975	47	+3.08%
1982	75	+6.90%
1990	75	+0.00%
1999	74	−0.15%
2007	81	+1.14%
2012	94	+3.02%
2017	91	−0.65%
2023	82	−1.72%
Source: INSEE

== See also ==
- Communes of the Côte-d'Or department
