= Charles Ignace Plichon =

French lawyer, businessman and politician

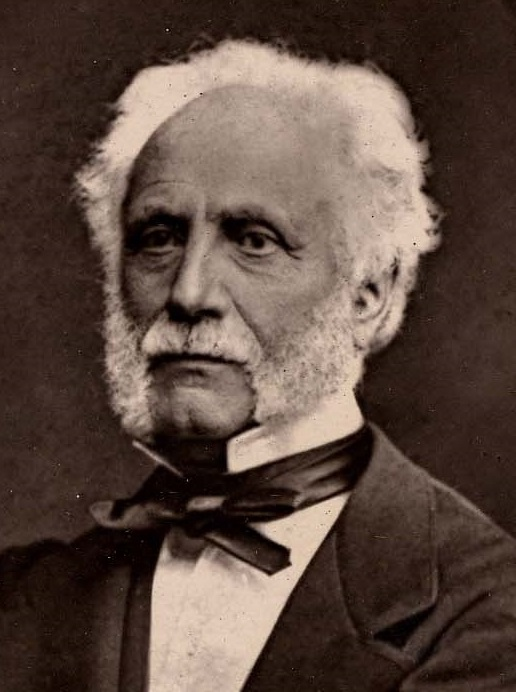
- Ignace Plichon c. 1882

Deputy for Nord (Hazebrouck)
- In office 1 August 1846 – 24 February 1848

Nord General Councilor
- In office 20 August 1848 – 3 June 1888

Deputy for Nord
- In office 21 June 1857 – 4 September 1870

Minister of Public Works
- In office 15 May 1870 – 10 August 1870
- Preceded by: Auguste de Talhouët-Roy
- Succeeded by: Jérôme David

Deputy for Nord
- In office 8 February 1871 – 3 June 1888

President of Nord General Council
- In office 19 October 1874 – 18 August 1879
- Preceded by: Paul Danel
- Succeeded by: Achille Testelin

Personal details
- Born: 28 June 1814 Bailleul, Nord, France
- Died: 3 June 1888 (aged 73) Paris, France
- Occupation: Lawyer, businessman, politician

Charles Ignace Plichon (28 June 1814 – 3 June 1888) was a French lawyer, businessman and politician. As a young man he was attracted to the social idealism of Saint-Simonianism. In 1841–42 he undertook a diplomatic and exploratory mission to the regency of Tunis, which was seeking French protection from the Turks In 1844–45 he travelled in Egypt to obtain information about the proposed Suez Canal, and returned via Palestine, Syria and Turkey. He represented Hazebrouck in the Nord department as a deputy in the last years of the July Monarchy. He avoided politics during the French Second Republic and the early years of the Second French Empire, then again represented Hazebrouck as a champion of Catholic and protectionist interests from 1857 until his death in 1888. He made a fortunate marriage through which he became President of the Compagnie des mines de Béthune. He was briefly Minister of Public Works in 1870.

== Early years (1814–41) ==
Ignace Plichon was born on 28 June 1814 in Bailleul, Nord. His parents were Ildephonse Plichon (1773–1855), a merchant and then manufacturer of salts and soaps, and Joséphine Bénédictine Leclercq (1772–1835). His grandfather was the censier (rent collector) of Marchiennes Abbey and mayor of Abscon. He was educated by the Jesuits at the Abbey of Saint-Acheul, then studied law in Paris.

In the early 1830s Plichon became a follower of the social idealism of Saint-Simonianism. When that movement's leader, Barthélemy Prosper Enfantin, added religion to the Saint-Simonian economic doctrine, Plichon accepted the new pantheism. Enfantin called Plichon his "dear penguin", an allusion to the fact that Plichon had lost an arm in a hunting accident. Enfantin, Barrault and other followers left for Egypt around 1832, while Plichon continued his studies in Paris. He returned to Bailleul to practice law, but in 1835 remained in correspondence with the Saint-Simonians in Paris. He received a doctorate in law in 1836.

== Tunisia (1841–42) ==
In 1841 Ahmed Bey of Tunis was concerned that the Sultan of Constantinople, theoretically his sovereign, was planning to send a fleet to obtain the tribute that was owed to him. He asked for the support of France. France did not want the Turks to threaten Algeria, which they had decided to fully occupy, so sent a naval division to La Goulette, the port of Tunis. They were joined there by a British force. François Guizot, the French Minister of Foreign Affairs, sent Plichon on a diplomatic mission to Tunis. He was instructed to also check the risk of a Turkish expedition to Tunis by land from Tripoli. (Note: In his memoirs, Guizot states that he sent Plichon on his mission in 1843. This is an error. The mission was in 1841–42.) Plichon, a young man with no diplomatic experience, was to cross the great tract of desert between the two cities.

Plichon reached La Goulette on 12 September 1841. He sailed to Tripoli where he learned about the local political situation from Captain Bailleul, head of the French military mission, then set out on the hazardous land journey from Tripoli to Tunis along the coast, passing through no man's land between the last Turkish outpost of Zuwarah and the Gulf of Gabès. In 1842 he presented his memoir on the regency of Tunis to Guizot. He confirmed that there was no risk of an upset to the status quo in Tunis. Although the religious reformer Muhammad al-Sanusi was present in the region, Plichon did not mention him in his report. His lengthy report discussed the history of the regency, once prosperous from piracy, now constrained by the French and British, and suffering from revolts in the south. The regency had the same area as France but only 600,000 inhabitants. Plichon provided many statistics on the Tunisian finances, army and tribal forces, and advocated the same expansive colonial policy as in Algeria.

== Egypt (1844–45) ==
In 1844, when Enfantin founded the journal L'Algérie, Plichon provided some of the financing. Enfantin, with support from François Barthélemy Arlès-Dufour, a Saint-Simonian financier of Lyon, was dreaming of creating a great railway network in France. He planned to also establish maritime commercial links with the Indies through a Suez canal. Enfantin decided to send Plichon to Egypt to obtain information. There he was welcomed by Saint-Simonians such as the engineer Charles Lambert, the doctor Nicolas Perron, and Linant de Bellefonds, author of a detailed study of projects to pierce the Isthmus of Suez. After obtaining the information he needed, Plichon took his time returning. He visited Upper Egypt as far as the first cataract and travelled by camel to see the Isthmus of Suez and the Sinai. He was robbed by Bedouins, who he thought had far less valour than the Tunisians and Tripolitanians. He visited Palestine and Syria, and by 1845 was in Constantinople. He then returned to Bailleul and local politics. Plichon was awarded the Legion of Honour after his return.

== July Monarchy deputy (1846–48) ==
In 1845 Bailleul was represented in the Chamber of Deputies by the legitimist mayor Louis Henri Behaghel. The 800 electors of the Hazebrouck constituency were more interested in Rothschild's planned railway network than in the dynastic question, and wanted their city to be the intersection between the Paris–Calais and Lille–Dunkirk main lines. Plichon was known to have ministerial contacts. The municipal council entrusted him, along with Béhagel's rival Lagrange, to take control of their affairs. Helped by Guizot, who wanted to reduce the influence of the loyalists in the Nord, Plichon achieved good results and became popular. He defeated Béhagel by 400 to 358 votes in the August 1846 legislative elections. Plichon held office from 1 August 1846 to 24 February 1848. He took an independent position within the ministerial group. After the French Revolution of 1848 he did not seek reelection as a deputy under the French Second Republic. In July 1849 he was elected general councilor of the Nord.

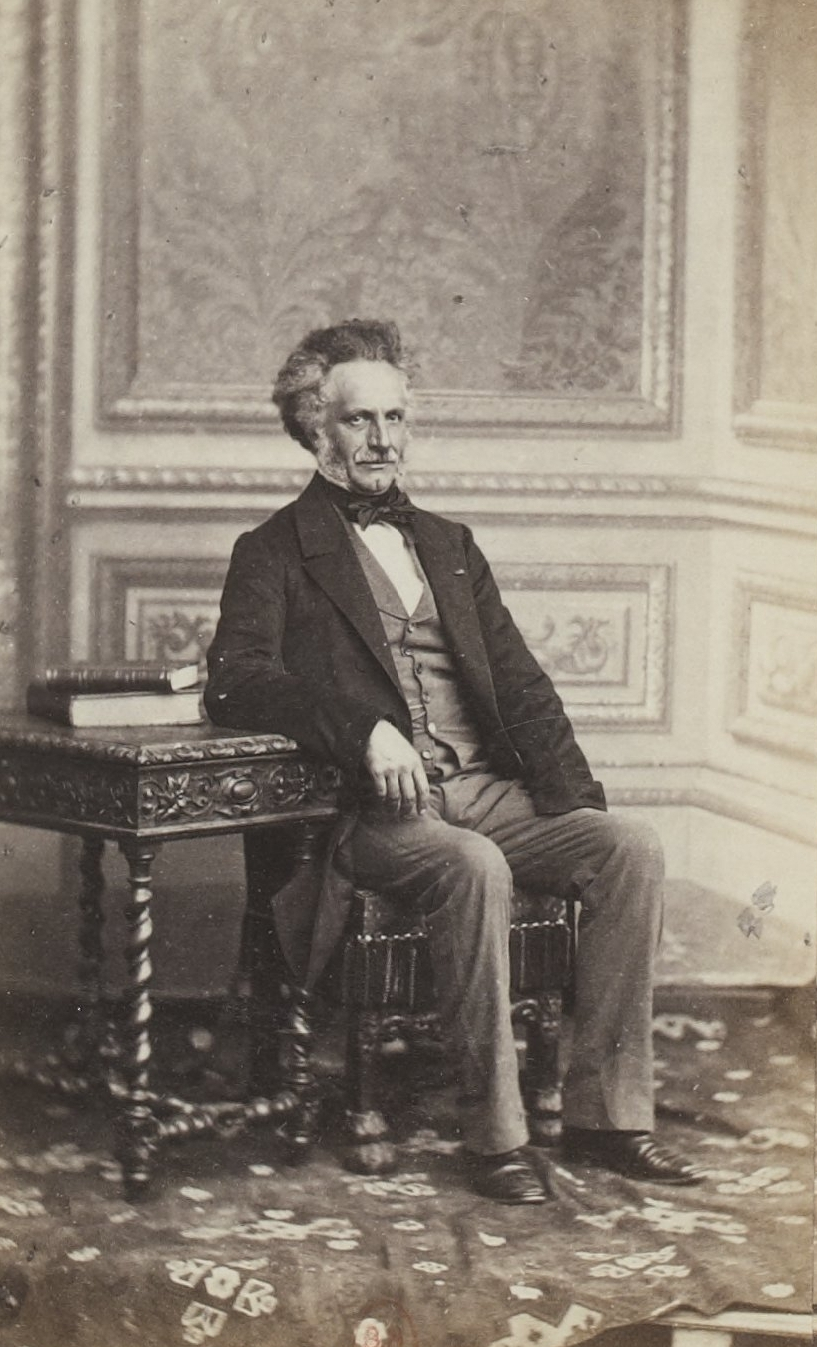
Plichon as a deputy of the Corps législatif

== Second French Empire (1851–70) ==
During the Second French Empire Ignace Plichon became a leader of the protectionists and Catholics. (Note: Robert and Couchy's 1889 official biography says Ignace Plichon was mayor of Arras. This is an error caused by confusion with Albert Plichon (1803–87).) Some thought that Plichon was the spokesperson for the "grande famille" of landowners in the Nord region, the intermarried Cleenwerck, Vandewalle, Bieswal and de Coussemacker families. He was elected a member of the Corps législatif for the 4th constituency of Nord on 22 June 1857.

Plichon was very independent in the legislature. In February 1858 he voted against the law of general safety. In March 1860 he demanded an inquiry into the election of Albert de Dalmas. He was one of the four deputies who voted against the tariff on wool, cotton and other raw materials in 1860. In 1860 he protested the invasions of Piedmont in such strong terms that the president of the Chamber, Charles de Morny, withdrew his speech. He criticized the inconsistency of Napoleon III's policies, saying "One cannot be revolutionary in Italy and remain conservative in France and Rome."

In 1861 Ignace Plichon married Adeline Marie Constance Marguerite Boittelle (1840–94). Plichon was 47 at the time, while Adeline was 21. His father in law was Alexis Boitelle, an administrator of the Compagnie des mines de Béthune, and Plichon became an administrator himself. Adeline's uncle was Symphorien Boittelle, a very energetic prefect of the Paris police from 1858 to 1866, deputy for the Nord until 1863, and Senator from 1866. Another uncle was Edward Boitelle, future member of the Legislature. The marriage opened the door to many influential Parisians close to the Boittelle and Haussmann families.

In 1862 Plichon spoke of the revival of socialism, saying a "certain press was responsible" while the Catholic journals had to remain silent. In February 1863 he attacked the system of official candidacies, and on this occasion demanded freedom of the press and electoral freedom. Despite losing official support, he was reelected on 1 June 1863 to the first constituency of the Nord against the official candidate, Alfred de Clebsattel. In a conservative region it might seem surprising that the official candidate would be decisively defeated by an Orléanist. However, Plichon was well-respected and locally generous, a protectionist and backed by the clergy. He won support from Legitimists from Bergues, Hondschoote and Wormhout, supporters of the Empire and republicans.

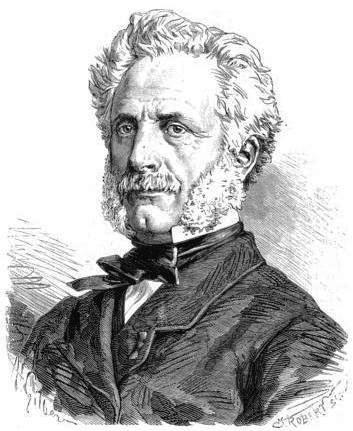
"M. Plichon, ministre des Travaux publics" (1870)

Plichon remained independent, although he often voted with the majority. He was made an Officer of the Legion of Honour on 14 August 1867. He was reelected on 24 May 1869. He did not face official opposition. He represented the Groupe Centre gauche. He signed the Interpellation of the 116 [deputies] in July 1869 demanding greater involvement in government decisions. He was a member of the commission of inquiry into the Merchant Navy. In February 1870 Plichon supported the Liberal Empire. On 15 May 1870 he replaced Auguste de Talhouët-Roy, who had resigned, as Minister of Public Works. He voted in favor of the Franco-Prussian War. He left office with the rest of the Ollivier cabinet on 10 August 1870. The Chamber was dissolved on 4 September 1870.

== French Third Republic (1871–88) ==
Under the French Third Republic Ignace Plichon was a member of the National Legislature and then the Chamber of Deputies for Nord from 8 February 1871 to 3 June 1888, representing the Union des Droites. He adhered to Marc Girardin's Orléanist opposition group. Plichon was elected General Councillor of Nord for the canton of Bailleul on 8 October 1871. He served as vice-president of the departmental council from 1871 to 1874 and president from 1874 to 1879. He was president of the Mines de Béthune administrative council from 1873 to 1883, when he resigned, apparently due to a conflict with his father in law Bouitelle. The company faced many difficulties during his term of office, and had only moderate growth, since neither Plichon nor Boitelle had technical training.

Plichon was elected deputy on 20 February 1876 for the Hazebrouck constituency. He continued to sit on the right, and supported the ministry of Albert de Broglie against the 363. He opposed the constitutional amendment proposed by Henri-Alexandre Wallon and the subsequent constitutional laws. He was reelected on 14 October 1877. He opposed the educational, colonial and economic policies of the Republican ministries. He ran for election as Senator for Nord on 5 January 1879, but did not succeed. Plichon was reelected as Deputy for Hazebrouck on 21 August 1881. He continued to sit on the right. He was reelected Deputy for Nord on 4 October 1885 as candidate of the Conservative Union.

Ignace Plichon died on 3 June 1888 in Paris. Ignace's son, Jean Plichon, was a monarchist deputy and then senator for Nord. His son Pierre was administrator for the Compagnie des Mines de Béthune. His grandson Jean-Pierre Plichon, son of Pierre, was deputy for Nord from 1936 to 1942.

== Publications ==
Selected parliamentary papers:

- Adolphe Billault; Jules Favre; Émile Keller; Louis Jean Koenigswarter; Émile Ollivier; Charles-Ignace Plichon (1862), La question romaine au Corps législatif, Paris : Poulet-Malassis / Corps législatif, p. 93
- Charles-Ignace Plichon (1864), Rapport sur les ports maritimes, Lille: impr. de L. Danel, p. 11
- Charles-Ignace Plichon (1871), Rapport fait au nom de la commission chargée d'examiner le projet de loi portant déclaration d'utilité publique l'établissement de chemins de fer concédés à titre éventuel à la compagnie du Nord Est..., Versailles: impr. de Cerf / Assemblée nationale, p. 7
- Charles-Ignace Plichon (1871), Rapport supplémentaire fait au nom de la commission chargée d'examiner le projet de loi portant déclaration d'utilité publique des chemins de fer concédés à titre éventuel à la compagnie du Nord-Est,..., Versailles: impr. de Cerf / Assemblée nationale, p. 2
- Charles-Ignace Plichon (1872), Rapport fait au nom de la commission du budget sur le budget des dépenses de l'exercice 1872 (chapitre 26 du budget du ministère de l'intérieur, subvention pour faciliter l'achèvement des chemins vicinaux ordinaires et d'intérêt commun), Versailles: impr. de Cerf / Assemblée nationale, p. 4
- Charles-Ignace Plichon (1872), Rapport fait au nom de la commission du budget sur le budget des dépenses de l'exercice 1872 (ministère de l'intérieur), Versailles: impr. de Cerf / Assemblée nationale, p. 41
- Charles-Ignace Plichon (1872), Rapport fait au nom de la commission du budget sur le budget des dépenses de l'exercice 1872 (ministère de l'intérieur, service de l'Algérie), Versailles: impr. de Cerf / Assemblée nationale, p. 22
- Charles-Ignace Plichon (1875), Rapport fait au nom de la commission du budget de 1875, chargée d'examiner le projet de loi ayant pour objet l'établissement d'un impôt sur les vinaigres et sur l'acide acétique, Versailles: impr. de Cerf et fils / Assemblée nationale, p. 42

== Sources ==
- Anceau, Eric (1999), "Charles Ignace Plichon", Dictionnaire des députés du second Empire (in French), P.U.R.
- Baycroft, Timothy (2004), Culture, Identity and Nationalism: French Flanders in the Nineteenth and Twentieth Centuries, Boydell & Brewer, ISBN 978-0-86193-269-6
- Emerit, Marcel (1974), "Du saint-simonisme au catholicisme : Ignace Plichon, député du Nord", Revue du Nord (in French), 56 (220): 29–42, doi:10.3406/rnord.1974.3210
- Guizot, François (1858), Mémoires pour servir ö l'histoire de mon temps (in French), Library of Alexandria, ISBN 978-1-4655-3946-5
- Ignace, Charles Plichon (in French), Assemblée nationale
- Jolly, Jean (1960–1977), "Plichon (Jean-Pierre, Ignace, Ildefonse, Louis)", Dictionnaire des parlementaires français de 1889 à 1940 (in French), Paris: Presses universitaires de France, ISBN 2-1100-1998-0
- Pierfit, Ignace PLICHON (in French)
- Przybyla, Francis (2007-08-07), Le Blé, le sucre et le charbon: Les parlementaires du Nord et leur action 1881-1889 (in French), Presses Univ. Septentrion, ISBN 978-2-85939-980-1
- Robert, Adolphe; Cougny, Gaston (1889), "Plichon, Ignace, Charles", Dictionnaire des parlementaires français de 1789 à 1889 (in French)
- Triaud, Jean-Louis (1995), La Légende noire de la Sanûsiyya: Une confrérie musulmane saharienne sous le regard français, 1840-1930 (in French), Les Editions de la MSH, ISBN 978-2-7351-0584-7
