= Jean-Pierre Plichon =

French politician (1907–1966)

Deputy for Nord
- In office 3 May 1936 – 31 May 1942

Personal details
- Born: Jean-Pierre Ignace Ildefonse Louis Plichon; 13 March 1907 Paris, France
- Died: 14 May 1966 (aged 59) Lille, Nord, France
- Education: École Centrale Paris
- Occupation: Politician

Jean-Pierre Plichon (13 March 1907 – 14 May 1966) was a French engineer and politician who was a deputy for the Nord department from 1936 to 1942. His grandfather and uncle had held the seat almost continuously since 1846. After the fall of France, in 1940 Plichon voted in favor of giving power to Marshall Petain.

== Early years ==
Jean-Pierre Plichon was born in Paris on 13 March 1907. His family was from the Nord department. His grandfather was Charles Ignace Plichon (1814–88), a company director who was first elected deputy in 1846, and then held office almost continuously until his death. After his grandfather died the Indicateur d'Hazebrouck asserted that "Flanders made Plichon, Plichon made Flanders". Jean-Pierre's parents were Pierre Plichon (1865–1936), a lawyer, and Aimée Salanson (1882–1963). His uncle was the industrialist Jean Plichon.

In 1924 his uncle was president of the Compagnie des mines de Béthune and Deputy for Nord. The Bethune mines had become a fief of the Plichons, since Pierre Plichon and Jean-Pierre Plichon also joined the company. Jean-Pierre Plichon studied at the Ecole centrale and qualified as an engineer of art and manufactures. He moved to Bailleul, Nord, where he worked in industry. On 6 July 1937 he married Odile Desmyttère (1917–2004).

== Political career ==
At the age of 29 Plichon ran for election in the second district of Hazebrouck, Nord, as candidate of the Republican Union. The seat had been occupied by his uncle, Lieutenant-Colonel Jean Plichon, since 1889. In his campaign he made the point that his family had already provided two deputies for the Nord department. He defended the family, stood for protection of commerce and industry, and supported higher prices for farmers and the right for them to organize. He did not have a clear majority in the first round of voting on 26 April 1936, but won in the second round on 3 May 1936.

Jean-Pierre Plichon was a member of the Chamber of Deputies representing the Nord department from 3 May 1936 to 31 May 1942 (Note: A decree of July 1939 prolonged the mandate of deputies elected in May 1936 to 31 May 1942.) as a member of the Independent Republicans and Social Action group. He was a member of committees on aeronautics and civil and criminal law. He was active in addressing the concerns of his constituents. He proposed laws to provide aid to victims of floods in the Nord, and to clear rivers. He wanted to encourage private construction, but was against excessive rents. He proposed large rural works to combat unemployment, and organization of the coal market. He was interested in many rural questions such as duties on imported hops, veterinary medicine, sharecropping and wheat.

Plichon sat on about 20 company boards. He was aged 32 at the outbreak of World War II (1939–45). He intervened on the subjects of tax relief for mobilized people, maintaining territorial integrity, suppressing espionage and excluding communists from the chamber of deputies. After the defeat of France, on 10 July 1940 he voted in favor of granting the requested constitutional powers to Marshal Philippe Pétain.

Jean-Pierre Plichon died in Lille, Nord, on 14 May 1966.

== Sources ==
- Anceau, Eric (1999), "Charles Ignace Plichon", Dictionary of deputies of the Second Empire (in French), PUR
- Emerit, Marcel (1974), "Du saint-simonisme au catholicisme : Ignace Plichon, député du Nord", Revue du Nord (in French), 56 (220): 29–42, doi:10.3406/rnord.1974.3210
- Guillaume, Sylvie; Lachaise, Barnard (2003), "Essai de synthèse régionale", Les parlementaires de la troisième république: actes du colloque international organisé par le Centre de recherches en histoire du XIXe siècle, Universités Paris I et Paris IV, UMR 8072 du CNRS, les 18 et 19 octobre 2001 (in French), Publications de la Sorbonne, ISBN 978-2-85944-484-6
- Jean-Pierre, Ignace, Ildefonse, Louis Plichon (in French), Assemblée nationale
- Jolly, Jean (1960–1977), "Plichon (Jean-Pierre, Ignace, Ildefonse, Louis)", Dictionnaire des parlementaires français de 1889 à 1940 (in French), Paris: Presses universitaires de France, ISBN 2-1100-1998-0
- "Monument aux morts des personnels des mines de Béthune", Mémoires de Pierre (in French)
- Pierfit, Jean Pierre PLICHON (in French)
