= Frontist Party =

1930s left-wing French political party

The Frontist Party (French: Parti frontiste, PF), also known as the Common Front or Social Front, was a political party in France founded in 1936 by Gaston Bergery and Georges Izard. It was a founding member of the Popular Front.

== Gaston Bergery and the 'Common Front Against Fascism' ==
Bergery had originally been the leading figure of the most left-wing faction of France's dominant centre-left progressive party, the Radical-Socialist Party. An undersecretary to the President of the Council (prime minister) during the first Cartel des Gauches (coalition of the left) in 1924, he had been heavily disappointed by the coalition's collapse in 1926. Thereafter, he advocated a close cooperation of the left-wing parties - chiefly the Radical-Socialists and the Socialist Party - around a programme of state-intervention in the economy and opposition to fascism. This policy found little popularity within the Radical-Socialist Party (where Bergery was mocked as a "Radical-Bolshevik"), and in early 1933 Bergery quit the party.

In the wake of the anti-parliamentary riots of February 1934 the mood in France changed: the centre-left coalition collapsed bringing down the Radical-Socialist government, replaced by a government of the right which the Left feared was a prelude to fascism. Dissidents from the three major left-wing parties, Bergery the ex-Radical-Socialist, Jacques Doriot, the number-two Communist leader (who, later, scorned by the Communists, went on to lead the fascist collaborationist French Popular Party), and the prominent socialist Georges Monnet, broke with their respective parties to form a 'Common Front Against Fascism', designed as a network where anti-fascists could coordinate resistance against further dictatorial trends, independently of party lines.

Bergery had thought that the Common Front would fill a much-demanded empty niche in French politics: a centre-left progressive party that was explicitly committed to opposing fascism and defending parliamentary institutions, while also addressing financial and economic issues through state intervention, and formally allying with the Socialist Party to do so. But it found no support from the main parties: the Socialist and Communist parties banned their members from participating, while the Radical-Socialist Party initially sided with the National government before gradually adopting the very ideas that Bergery had advocated. Bergery imagined that the public would prove more enthusiastic than the party leaders. To prove the point he resigned from Parliament (20 February 1934) to run again in the name of the antifascist Common Front; instead, opposed by the leadership of the Radical-Socialist Party and supported only by the local socialists and Radical-Socialists, he ended up losing his seat.

== Georges Izard and Troisième Voie ==
This electoral setback prompted Bergery to look to other like-minded allies. However, while the Communist, Socialist and Radical-Socialist Parties all had factions with similar ideas, none would quit their party over the issue. This led Bergery to turn to the small Catholic-socialist group Troisième Voie (Third Way).

Troisième Voie had begun as a reflection circle linked with Esprit, a progressive Catholic journal concerned with discovering a solution to the economic crisis, via a 'third way' between socialism and laissez-faire liberalism. Georges Izard, a Catholic intellectual and former ministerial undersecretary, disagreed with the prevailing tendency within Esprit to pursue this third way through a modernised social-Catholicism. In 1933 he left to found Troisième Force.

== The Social Front ==
In November 1934, Bergery's Common Front and Izard's Troisième Voie held an assembly and merged into a unified party. This was initially named the Social Front, as the Socialist and Communist parties had formed an alliance; the term 'Common Front' had recently begun to be largely associated with the recent alliance of the Marxist PCF, PUP and SFIO parties.

In July 1935, an alliance of anti-fascist parties and civil society organisations was founded, known as the Popular Front. The Social Front was one of the original signatories. In early1936, to avoid confusion between the Popular Front and Social Front, the latter renamed itself as the more distinctive Frontist Party.

== The Frontist Party and the Popular Front ==
By mid-1935 all of the three major left-wing parties had converged onto an agreement on the need to cooperate on a programme of anti-fascism, state-intervention and the defence of liberal parliamentary institutions. The existence of the Popular Front, therefore, undercut the Frontist Party's very raison d'etre.

In the elections of 1936, the Frontist Party had little success. Its two co-founders, Bergery and Izard, were both elected to Parliament, but two deputies were too few to form a distinct parliamentary group and thus during the 1936-1940 legislature had to sit among the other left-leaning independents and minor parties, in the Independent Left technical group.

The fact that the Frontist Party had just two deputies, each of them a co-founder of the party and each originally from a distinct political tradition, Radicalism and social-Catholicism, meant that the party was permanently split in two.

The Troisième Force wing of the party concluded that the weak showing in the elections of 1936 signalled the failure of the Frontist Party's political goals, and in November 1937 they broke away from the Frontist Party.

Meanwhile, under the Léon Blum government (1936–37), Bergery grew increasingly critical of the Soviet Union and the French Communist Party. He distanced himself from the rest of the Popular Front, and increasingly adopted a tone of 'national revolution' that converged in some aspects with the very same fascist right that he had originally set out to oppose. This trajectory would ultimately bring him on board with the Vichy Regime.

== Sources ==
- Burrin, Philippe. La dérive fasciste : Doriot, Déat, Bergery (1933-1945). Paris, 2003.
- Jolly, Jean, ed. "Gaston Bergery". Dictionnaire des parlementaires français (1889-1940). Paris, 1960
