= Pierre Amidieu du Clos =

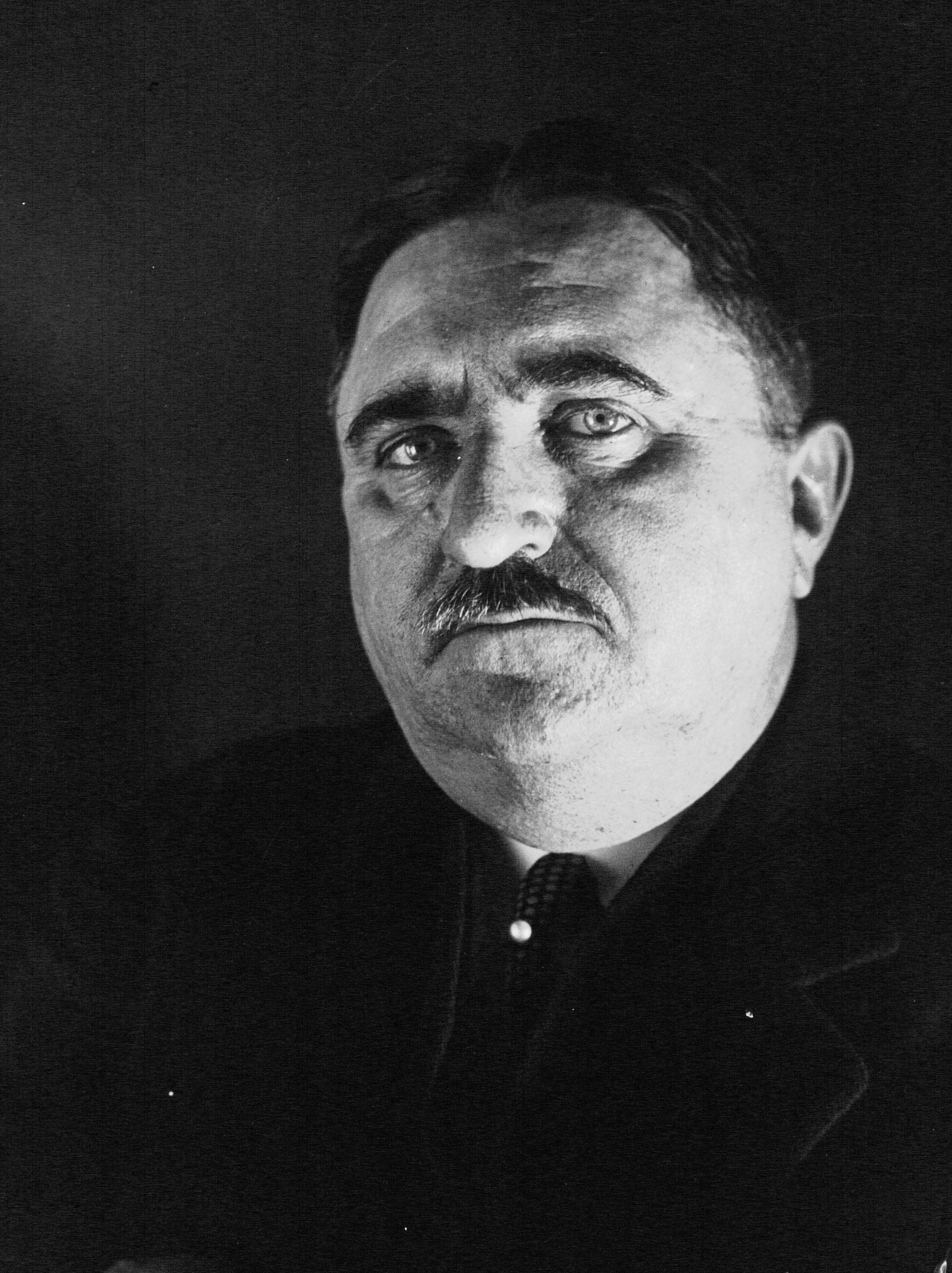
- Pierre Amidieu du Clos in 1933

Deputy for Meurthe-et-Moselle
- In office 29 April 1928 – 31 May 1936

Personal details
- Born: Pierre Antoine Marie Amidieu du Clos; 16 September 1881 Longwy, Meurthe-et-Moselle, France
- Died: 30 August 1955 (aged 73) Nice, Alpes-Maritimes, France
- Occupation: Engineer, iron master, politician

Pierre Amidieu du Clos (16 September 1881 – 30 August 1966) was a French engineer, iron master and politician. He inherited interests in industrial operations in Lorraine, and later went into politics. He had right wing views, and was a strong nationalist. He collaborated with the Germans during the occupation of France during World War II.

== Life ==
Pierre Amidieu du Clos was born in Longwy, Meurthe. His parents were Raoul Amidieu de Clos and Pauline Legendre. On his father's side he was descended from the Amédée family of Florence, whose members included the founder of the Servite Order. They had emigrated to France with Marie de' Medici (1575–1642), then in the 17th century had moved to Santo Domingo. After the French Revolution they returned to France, where one of Pierre ancestors married Bénigne, marquise de Fontaines. On his mother's side Pierre Amidieu du Clos belonged to a family of iron masters.

Amidieu du Clos studied with the Jesuits at Reims. He wanted to become a lawyer, but accepted the request of his family, who owned the Forges du bassin de Briey, and studied at the École centrale des arts et manufactures, where he was a brilliant student. He settled in Longwy where he became an iron master. On 18 October 1907 in Montpellier he married Marguerite de Fesquet (1886–1976). His wife came from an old Montpellier family.

Amidieu du Clos received the Croix de Guerre 1914–1918 after World War I. In 1920 he partnered with Louis Petitier and the Saint-Rémy family to buy up the breweries of Longwy, marketing their beer as "Brasseries de Longwy". They were pioneers in selling beer cans with capsules. In 1924 Amidieu du Clos succeeded Louis Petitier as mayor of Longwy, and became vice-president of the Mayors' Union. He was Mayor of Longwy until 1929, and was again mayor from 1935 to 1939.

== Deputy ==
Amidieu du Clos was among the Catholic industrialists who were well-represented in the Republican Federation (Fédération républicaine), others being François de Wendel, Guy de Wendel and Jean Plichon. He was elected in the second round of the legislative elections of 22–29 April 1928 for the first electoral district of Briey, Meurthe-et-Moselle. Guy de Wendel was the representative of the second district. Amidieu du Clos joined the Union républicaine et démocratique. He was very active in the chamber and was a member of committees on Alsace-Lorraine, Customs and commercial conventions and Liberated regions. He tabled many legislative proposals on subjects such as affordable housing, rents, war damage, border issues, imports and customs.

During the financial crisis of the 1930s the migrant workers in France were easy scapegoats. On 18 December 1931, Amidieu de Clos told the Chamber, "we are suffering not from an unemployment crisis, but from a foreign invasion crisis". His proposed law on protection of the national workforce, reported by Louis Dumat^{(fr)}, became law on 10 August 1932.

Amidieu du Clos was reelected in the second round in the general elections of 1–8 May 1932. He joined the group of Indépendants d'action économique, sociale et paysanne. He was appointed to the committees on Customs and commercial conventions, Liberated regions, Army and Labour. He tabled 31 bills on a range of different subjects, and was involved in many debates. During a debate about the education budget Amidieu du Clos protested the financial advantages he thought French secondary schools gave to foreign students, and said only French citizens should get university scholarships. In the June 1936 elections Amidieu du Clos was defeated in Briey by the Catholic lawyer George Izard, brother-in-law of Father Jean Daniélou and a member of the small Parti Frontiste. Izard sat with the socialists in the Chamber.

== Later career ==
Amidieu du Clos chaired the French subsidiary of Allgemeine Elektricitäts-Gesellschaft (AEG) after World War I. In August 1936, after the triumph of the Popular Front in France, baron Auguste Jacquinot, a member of the board of AEG Luxembourg, arranged for him to meet with the German Minister in the duchy.

After the outbreak of World War II (1939–45) Amidieu du Clos rejoined the army and was appointed a colonel. During the occupation of France he was chairman of the board of directors of the Société française Krupp. The company was founded on 19 April 1943 by a private act and was given the appearance of a French identity by its "first directors", Amidieu du Clos, Jacques Breil, Émile-Joseph Cuiller and Georges Ramat. Krupp France was in fact 100% owned by Alfried Krupp. This caused Amidieu du Clos problems after the Liberation of France. Pierre Amidieu du Clos died on 30 August 1955 in Nice, Bouches-du-Rhône. He was Officer of the Legion of Honour and a member of the Order of Leopold (Belgium).

== Sources ==
- Bourget, Pierre (April 1986), "UN PRÉCURSEUR DE DE GAULLE?", Revue d'histoire de la Deuxième Guerre mondiale et des conflits contemporains (in French), 36e Année (142), Presses Universitaires de France: 103–107, JSTOR 25729344
- collectif (1988), "Amidieu du Clos, Pierre", Dictionnaire des parlementaires français de 1940 à 1958 (in French), vol. 1. A, Paris: La documentation française, ISBN 978-2110019981
- Jolly, Jean (1960–1977), "Amidieu du Clos (Pierre Antoine Marie)", Dictionnaire des parlementaires français de 1889 à 1940 (in French), Presses universitaires de France
- Lacroix-Riz, Annie (13 January 2010), Le choix de la défaite: Les élites françaises dans les années 1930, Armand Colin, ISBN 978-2-200-25622-7
- Lacroix-Riz, Annie (2013), Industriels et banquiers français sous l'Occupation (in French), Armand Colin, ISBN 978-2-200-28891-4
- Lewis, Mary Dewhurst (2007), The Boundaries of the Republic: Migrant Rights and the Limits of Universalism in France, 1918-1940, Stanford University Press, ISBN 978-0-8047-5722-5
- "Longwy : quand la bière coulait à flot dans la cité des Émaux", Le Républicain Lorrain (in French), 10 February 2016
- Pierrard, Pierre (1988), Les laïcs dans l'Eglise de France: XIXe-XXe siècle (in French), Editions de l'Atelier, ISBN 978-2-7082-2563-3
- Passmore, Kevin (2013), The Right in France from the Third Republic to Vichy, OUP Oxford, ISBN 978-0-19-965820-6
- Pierfit, "Pierre AMIDIEU du CLOS", Geneanet (in French)
- Pierre, Antoine, Marie Amidieu du Clos (in French), Assemblée nationale
- Schor, Ralph (2004), Français et immigrés en temps de crise: (1930–1980) (in French), Editions L'Harmattan, ISBN 978-2-296-36710-4
