= Guy de Wendel =

French politician

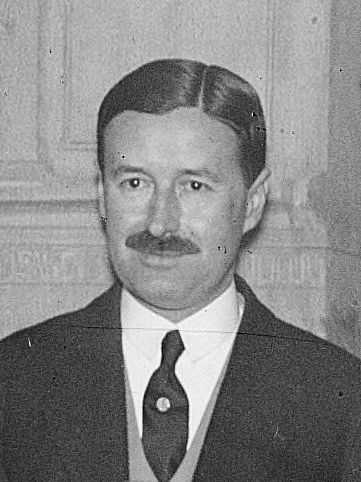
- Guy de Wendel as a newly-elected deputy in 1919

Deputy for Moselle
- In office 16 November 1919 – 25 January 1927

Senator for Moselle
- In office 9 January 1927 – 31 December 1941

Personal details
- Born: René Pierre Alvaro Guy de Wendel d'Hayange; 22 April 1878 Paris, France
- Died: 6 April 1955 (aged 76) Paris, France
- Education: HEC Paris
- Occupation: Politician

Guy de Wendel (22 April 1878 – 6 April 1955) was a French politician from a family of Lorraine industrialists, who served as deputy and then senator for Moselle, Lorraine. After the fall of France in World War II (1939–45), he voted in favour of granting Marshal Pétain the constitutional powers he had requested.

== Early years (1878–1914) ==
The de Wendel family can be traced back to Jean Wendel of Bruges, who married Marie de Wanderve around 1600. His descendants in the male line mostly pursued military careers. Jean's descendant Jean-Martin Wendel (1665–1737) purchased an ironworks in Hayange, Lorraine, in 1704. This was the foundation of the family's industrial operations. He was ennobled as Jean-Martin de Wendel in 1727 by Leopold, Duke of Lorraine. He was followed by eight generations of steelmakers.

Guy de Wendel was born on 22 April 1878 in Paris. He was the son of the steel manufacturer Robert de Wendel (1847–1917). He studied at the Lycée Janson-de-Sailly, and then obtained a diploma from the École des Hautes Etudes Commerciales. On 25 December 1902 he married Emmanuella Catherine Argyropoulos (25 December 1878 – 2 December 1960). His wife was the daughter of Alexandre P. Argyropoulos (1849–1909), Lieutenant Colonel in the Artillery of the Greek Army. They had one daughter, Hélène de Wendel (1903–1986). Guy de Wendel had a château built in 1906.

== World War I (1914–18) ==
In 1914 Guy de Wendel was mobilized in an automobile formation, and was transferred at his request to the cavalry. He became a sergeant, then in September 1915 was appointed second lieutenant. In 1916 he was transferred to the 8th army staff, and in February 1917 was made a lieutenant. He requested a transfer to the infantry in March 1917 and was given command of a company in the 5th Infantry Regiment. Following a counter-attack at the Chemin des Dames he became a knight of the Legion of Honour on 14 July 1917. On 5 August 1917 he was awarded the Croix de Guerre with palm.

Guy de Wendel was made a captain in May 1918, and commanded a battalion in the last major operations of the war. He fought in Charles Mangin's 10th army on 18 July 1918 in the Second Battle of the Marne. He was at the Chemin des Dames in September and took part in the Fifth Battle of Ypres in October. He was highly praised in six citations.

== Inter-war period (1918–39) ==
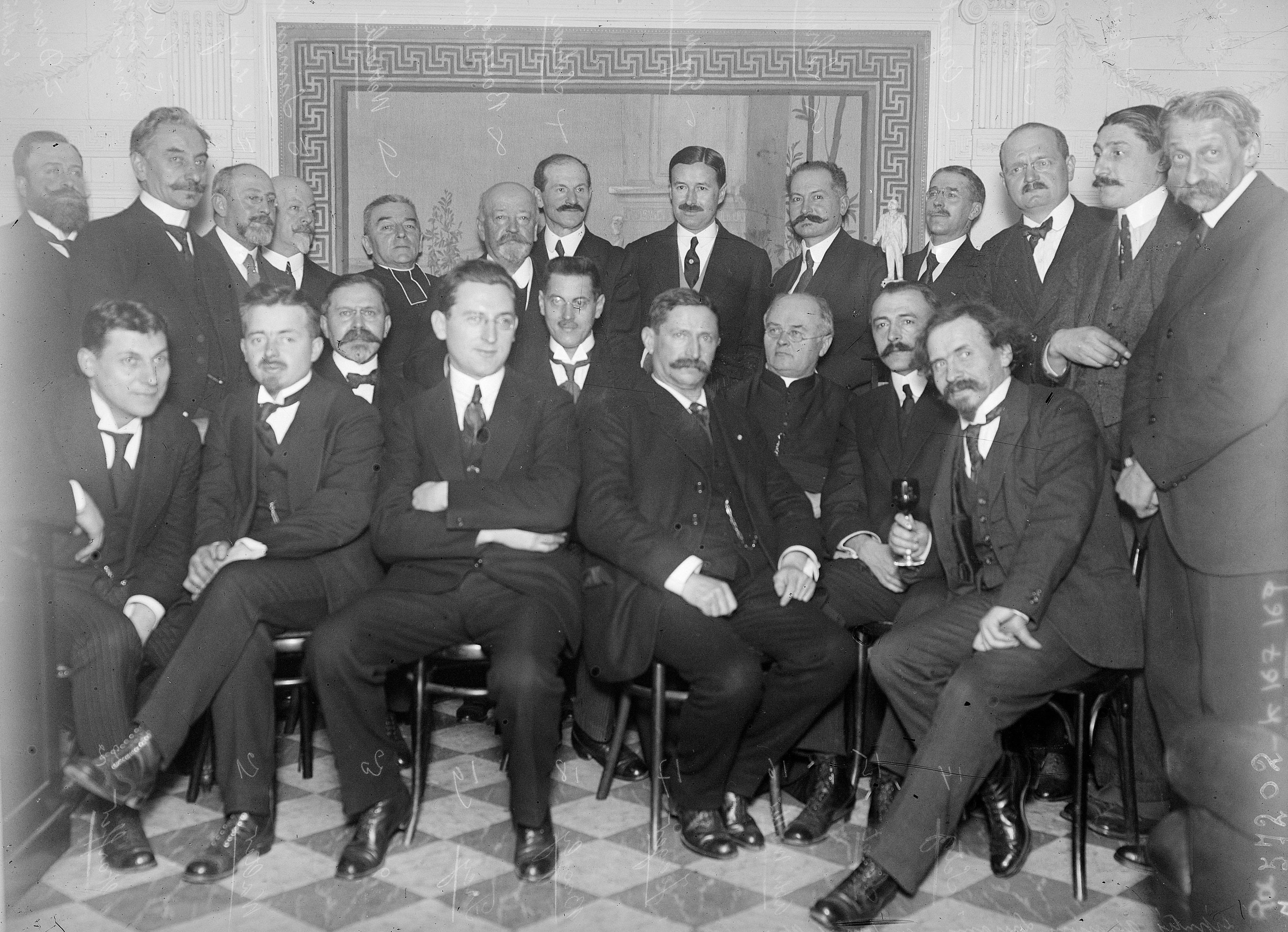
Alsace-Lorraine deputies in 1919

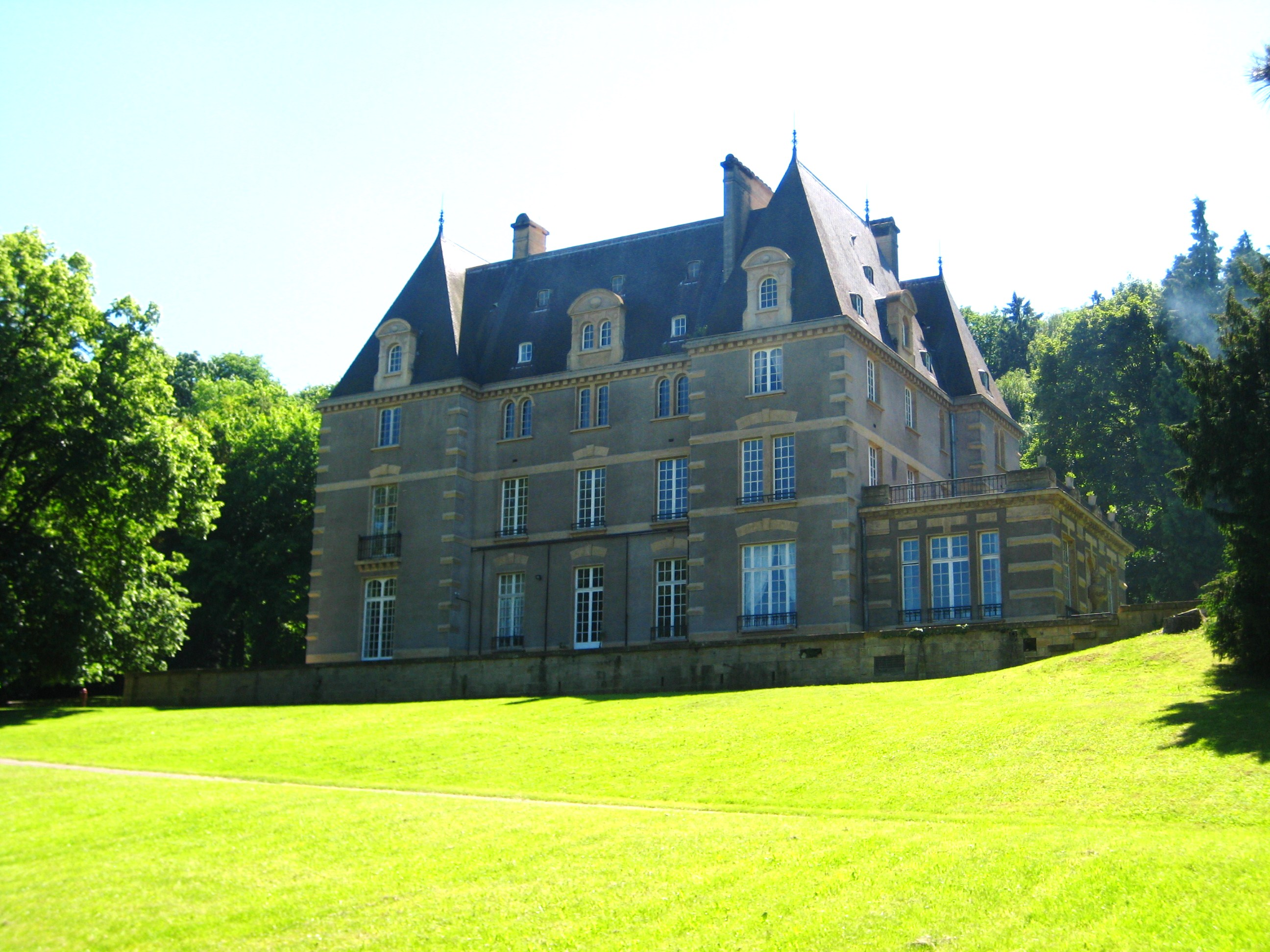
Château du Tournebride in Hayange was built for Guy de Wendel in 1906

In 1919 Guy de Wendel was appointed gérant of the Petits-fils de François de Wendel et Cie (PFFW) in Hayange. The PFFW had been created by Henri de Wendel in 1871 to control the Wendel family's steel operations in Lorraine, at that time annexed to Germany, while Wendel at Cie controlled the operations in France. Guy de Wendel was also a director of the Beeringen Coal Company and the Orange-Nassau mines.

Guy de Wendel was deputy for Moselle from 1919 to 1927, senator from 1927 to 1941, and president of the General Council of Moselle from 1924 to 1936. He was elected deputy of the Moselle on 16 November 1919 on the Lorraine Republican Democratic Union platform, and was reelected on 11 May 1924. He joined committees on social insurance and social welfare, the army, mines, power and Alsace-Lorraine. He made proposals for legislation for canalizing the Moselle from Metz to downstream of Thionville, and for making unused barracks and government buildings available for the gendarmerie.

As a member of the General Council of Moselle from 1922 Guy de Wendel was responsible for the development of various types of social services for workers in Moselle, and for physical education, sports and military training. He was elected senator for Moselle on 9 January 1927 in the first round, and was reelected in the first round on 16 October 1932. He was involved in committees of health, welfare, insurance and social welfare, the army, finance, colonies and mines.

== World War II and later (1939–55) ==
After the outbreak of World War II Guy de Wendel rejoined the army under General Henri Giraud. On 10 July 1940, in Vichy, he voted in favour of granting Marshal Philippe Pétain the constituent powers he had requested. He then retired from public life. Guy de Wendel died in Paris on 6 April 1955. After Guy's death his wife entered the Carmel de Paray-le-Monial on 4 July 1956 with the name of sister Catherine de Jésus. The Château Guy de Wendel was occupied by his niece, Ségolène de Wendel (1908–81). Later it became a hotel, restaurant and business center.

== Sources ==
- collectif (31 December 1988), "WENDEL (Guy de)", Dictionnaire des parlementaires français (1940-1958) (in French), Paris: La Documentation française, ISBN 978-2110019981
- "François de Wendel (1874–1949)", Annales des Mines, CGE
- Garric, Alain, "Guy DE WENDEL", Geneanet (in French)
- Jolly, Jean (1960–1977), "WENDEL (PIERRE, RENÉ, Guy de)", Dictionnaire des parlementaires français (1889-1940) (in French), Paris: Presses universitaires de France, ISBN 2-1100-1998-0
- "Le Château", Le Château Guy de Wendel
- "Wendel", Section Genealogique, Association Artistique de la Banque de France, archived from the original on 2016-03-03
