= Maling (surname) =

Maling is a surname. Notable people with the surname include:

- Arthur Maling (1923–2013), American writer
- George Allan Maling (1888–1929), English doctor and recipient of the Victoria Cross
- Harriet Florence Maling (1918–1987), American pharmacologist
- Joan Maling, American linguist
- John Allan Maling (1920–2012), British soldier of the Second World War who won the Military Cross
- John Darwin Maling (1915–2009), British Indian Army officer
- Simon Maling (born 1975), New Zealand rugby player
- Thomas James Maling (1778–1849), Royal Navy officer
