= Actions of the Hohenzollern Redoubt =

1915 engagement on the Western Front of World War I

Action of the Hohenzollern Redoubt
- Part of the Battle of Loos on the Western Front of the First World War
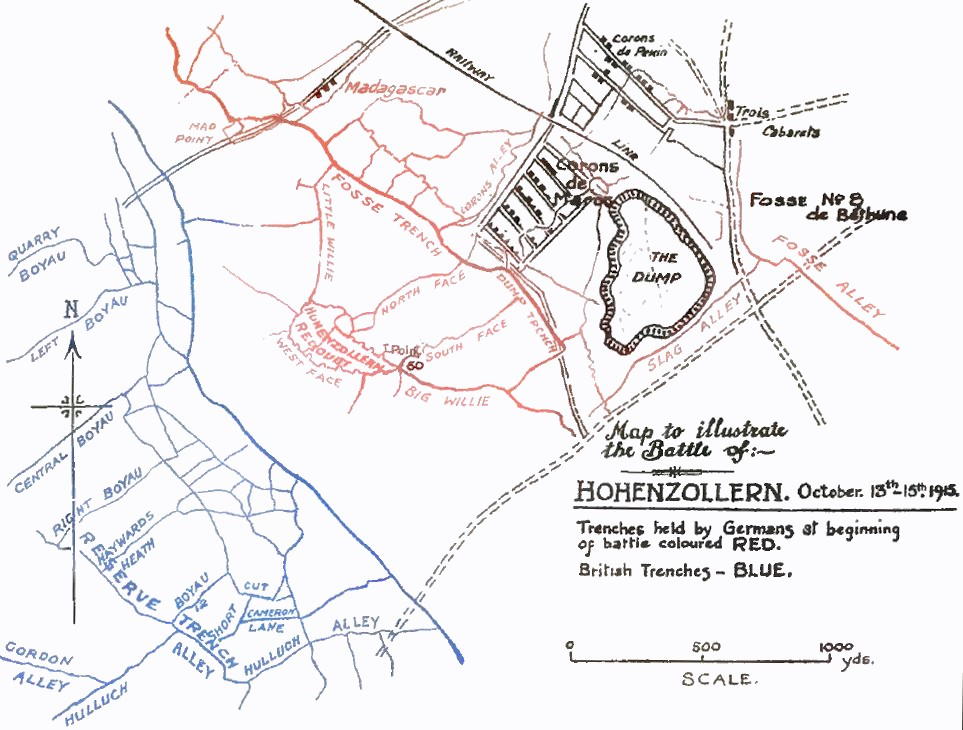
- British trenches shown in blue, German in red, 13 October 1915.
Date	13–19 October 1915
Location	Auchy-les-Mines, France 50.501°N 2.775°E
Result	German victory

Belligerents
(United Kingdom of Great Britain and Ireland) British Empire; France	German Empire

Commanders and leaders
(United Kingdom of Great Britain and Ireland) John French (French Third Republic) Ferdinand Foch (United Kingdom of Great Britain and Ireland) George Thesiger	(German Empire) Erich von Falkenhayn (German Empire) (Kingdom of Bavaria) Rupprecht, Crown Prince of Bavaria (German Empire) Ernst Kuntze

Units involved
9th and 46th divisions	117th Division and elements of several others

Casualties and losses
3,643	3,000 (partial)
- The German 117th Division lost 6,572 casualties during the Battle of Loos.
- Auchy-les-Mines near Loos-en-Gohelle, Nord-Pas-de-Calais, France

The Actions of the Hohenzollern Redoubt took place on the Western Front in World War I from 13 to 19 October 1915, at the Hohenzollern Redoubt (Hohenzollernwerk) near Auchy-les-Mines in France. In the aftermath of the Battle of Loos (25 September – 8 October 1915), the 9th (Scottish) Division captured the strongpoint and then lost it to a German counter-attack. The British attack on 13 October failed and resulted in 3,643 casualties, mostly in the first few minutes. In the History of the Great War, James Edmonds wrote that "The fighting [from 13 to 14 October] had not improved the general situation in any way and had brought nothing but useless slaughter of infantry".

== Background ==
=== Strategic developments ===
In the summer of 1915 the German armies continued the strengthening of front trenches, communication trenches and strong-points ordered by Chief of the General Staff General Erich von Falkenhayn, who on 25 January had also ordered the building of more defensive lines behind the front trench. Crown Prince Rupprecht the Sixth Army commander and some Western Front generals had objected to this policy, as an invitation to German troops to retreat rather than fight. After the experience of the Battle of Festubert, where Allied artillery had proved capable of destroying a great width of front trench, opposition had been abandoned and the work carried on as quickly as possible. In early May Falkenhayn had also ordered that a second defensive position be built 2,000–3,000 yd (1.1–1.7 mi; 1.8–2.7 km) behind the whole of the Western Front, to force an attacker to pause to move artillery forward into range.

Plans to exploit the Franco-British superiority in numbers on the Western Front, while one third of the German army was on the Russian Front were agreed at a Conference by Joffre and French at Chantilly on 14 September. The British New Armies had begun to arrive, the number of heavy guns had increased since the offensives of May and June and by concentrating resources at the points of attack an even greater numerical superiority could be obtained over the Germans. An unprecedented preliminary bombardment of the German defences would be possible and make attacks by the greater number of Allied infantry decisive. Simultaneous offensives would be mounted from Champagne and Artois towards Namur, the principal attack being made in Champagne.

The attack by the French Tenth Army on Vimy Ridge in May and June had failed, which left the German Sixth Army in control of the high ground below which the French were to have assembled a mass of artillery and infantry. It was agreed that in Artois a Franco-British offensive would be mounted towards Douai, by the French Tenth and the British First armies, co-ordinated by General Foch on a front of 20 miles (32 km) between Arras and La Bassée canal. The British First Army was to attack between Grenay and La Bassée canal on a 6-mile (9.7 km) front, with six divisions and three in reserve. The Cavalry Corps and Indian Cavalry Corps were to be held ready to exploit a German collapse. The Franco-British armies were to attack towards Tournai, Valenciennes and Le Quesnoy and subsidiary attacks were to be made by the rest of the Franco-British armies to pin down German reserves.

=== Tactical developments ===
Field artillery available to the British divisions covered a 1-mile (1.6 km) front, with 19 heavy guns in support, while the Tenth Army divisional frontages were .75-mile (1.21 km) wide with 35 heavy guns. The smaller number of British guns was matched by a lack of ammunition. The offensives were to begin with a continuous and methodical bombardment for 96 hours, in which counter-battery fire was as important as trench destruction. A four-hour intense bombardment was to be fired, before the infantry attacks in Artois and Champagne began simultaneously on 25 September. The infantry were to advance as an "irresistible mass", with reserves arranged in depth to move forward at the same time as the leading troops, ready to take over and maintain the momentum of the assault. Previous attacks in Artois had been obstructed by the many villages and industrial premises in the region, which were easy for the Germans to fortify and use to delay attacks. The Franco-British heavy artillery was to be used to destroy German fortified houses and villages, which were proof against field artillery. Such tactics were expected to break through both German defensive positions and enable the cavalry to rush forward and widen the breakthroughs, before advancing on distant objectives in Belgium. If the attacks succeeded the rest of the Franco-British-Belgian armies would join in a general offensive and force the German armies into open warfare, in which Allied numerical superiority would be overwhelming.

== Prelude ==
=== British preparations ===
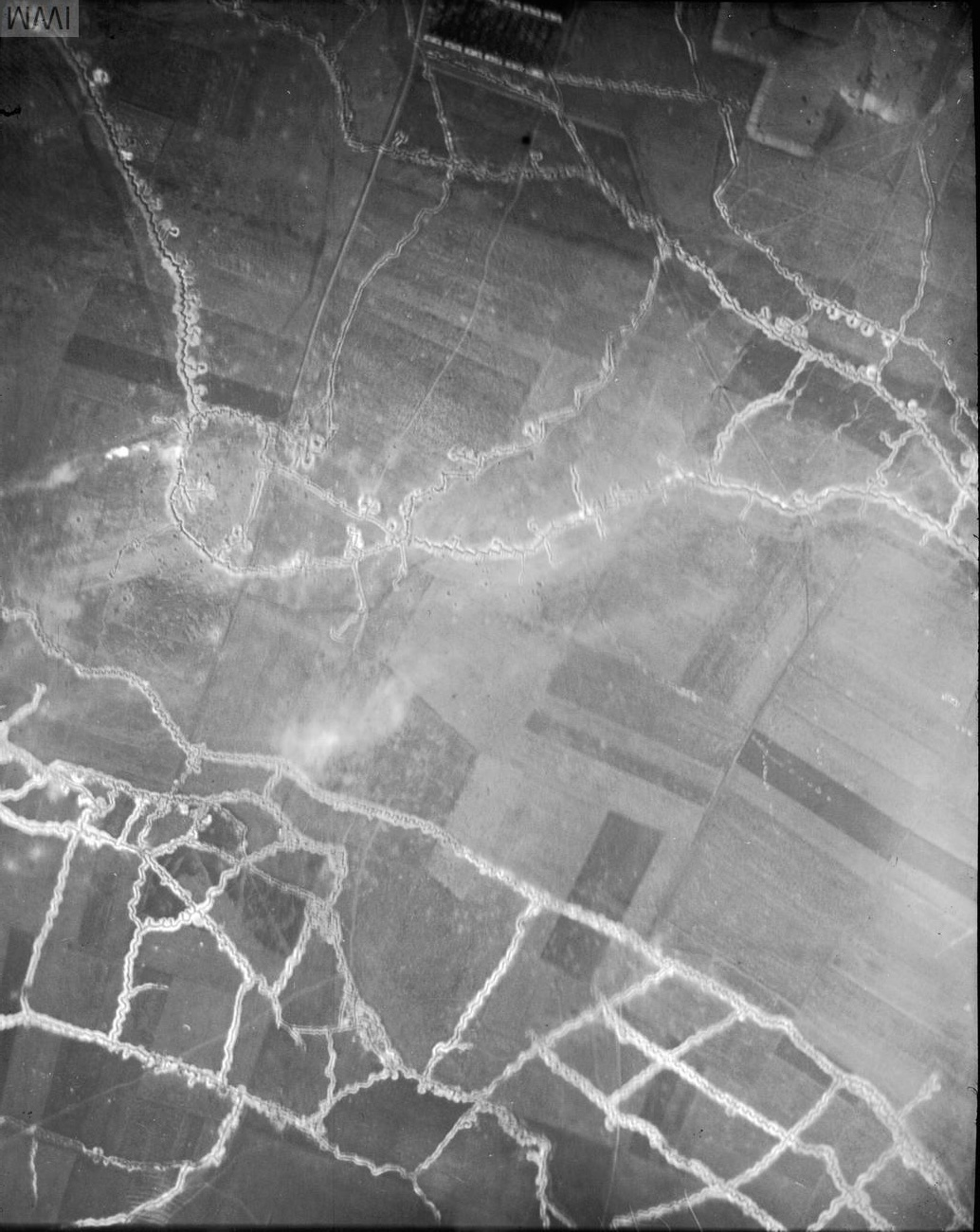
Aerial photograph of the Hohenzollern Redoubt, 1915

The artillery of the 9th (Scottish) Division was arranged in two mobile groups and a reserve. One field artillery brigade supported each of the two attacking infantry brigades and two howitzer brigades with a mountain battery, were held back for counter-battery fire and targets of opportunity on the divisional front. The three brigade field companies of the Royal Engineers and the pioneer battalion were placed in reserve. Two 9.2-inch howitzers were dug in near a wood at Beuvry with arrangements made for ground and air observation of their fire and Russian saps were dug towards the redoubt. On the night before the attack the saps were opened and the ends joined, to make a jumping-off trench 150 yards (140 m) away from the face of the redoubt.

=== British plan ===
The 9th Division commanded by Major-General George Thesiger was to attack with 26th Brigade and 28th Brigade on a front of 1,500 yards (1,400 m) between the left flank of the 7th Division and the Vermelles–La Bassée railway to capture the German front and support trenches. The divisional objectives were the buildings and dump of Fosse 8 and the Hohenzollern Redoubt. The Dump was a flat-topped spoil-heap 20 feet (6.1 m) high with a commanding view and had been made the principal German observation post in the area. When captured The Dump would give the British observation over Haisnes and St. Elie. On the right the 26th Brigade with two battalions, was to overrun the Hohenzollern Redoubt and Fosse 8 in the first rush. The two supporting battalions would then attack south of the fosse and advance on Haisnes, while the leading battalions reorganised to follow on in support, as the fosse was consolidated by the 28th Brigade. (Note: Several battalion commanders found the orders so optimistic that they thought that they had misunderstood them and one said, "... it seems to be forgotten that infantry don't gallop".) The division was then to capture the redoubt, The Dump and Fosse 8 before advancing to the Lens–La Bassée road; after reaching the road the division was to press on to the German second position between Cité St. Elie and Haisnes. The 27th Brigade in reserve, was then to advance through Douvrin to the Haute Deûle Canal (Canal de la Deûle), with the 7th Division on the right flank; XI Corps would then pass through to continue the advance.

=== German preparations ===
A number of pit-heads known as Fosses and auxiliary shafts called Puits had been built around Loos, when the area was developed by the mining industry; Fosse 8 de Béthune was close to the north end of a spoil-heap (Crassier) known as "The Dump". The Crassiers had been tunnelled or hollowed out by both sides, to provide observation-posts and machine-gun nests. The Dump was 20-foot (6.1 m) high, with an excellent view in all directions. New fortifications were built as quickly as possible, after the Franco-British offensives in May and June 1915. At Dump and Fosse trenches, on a slight rise 400 yards (370 m) in front of the original front line, a new defensive work wired for all-round defence was built and named the Hohenzollernwerk. The face of the redoubt was 300 yards (270 m) long and curved, with extensions to join with "Big Willie" Trench to the south and "Little Willie" Trench to the north. British planners judged the Hohenzollern Redoubt to be the strongest defensive-work on the whole of the front. In the area of Fosse 8, more fortifications were built in July by the German 117th Division, after it had fought at Vimy Ridge in May and June; once a period of reorganisation at Roubaix was over, the division returned to the line on 9 July.

== Battle ==
=== First phase: 25 September – 8 October ===
==== First Army ====
On 25 September, the two leading battalions of the 26th Brigade attacked from the jumping-off trench at 6:30 a.m., under the cover of the gas discharge, a smoke-shell barrage from Stokes mortars and phosphorus grenades, which formed a thick yellow screen. The gas was not blown far into no man's land and many British troops were poisoned. The gas and smoke persisted for long enough for the first infantry companies in the attack to form up behind it, ready to advance when the British artillery lifted off the German front trenches. The right-hand battalion advanced through the screen, into German small-arms fire, found the wire well cut but quickly entered the German trenches, finding little organised resistance from the garrison. The battalion bombed forward along communication trenches, North Face and South Face trenches to reach Fosse Trench around 7:00 a.m., with few additional casualties. The troops continued towards Fosse 8, the cottages nearby and The Dump, as German troops retired towards Auchy and by 7:30 a.m. the British had reached Three Cabarets and occupied Corons Trench east of the fosse, before pausing to re-organise.

The left-hand battalion waited for ten minutes for the gas and smoke, to move towards their objective at Little Willie Trench but then advanced through it at 6:40 a.m. regardless. As the British emerged from the screen they were engaged by fire from Madagascar ("Mad") Point to the left, which inflicted many losses on the first lines of infantry. The advance accelerated and Little Willie was entered, the wire having been well cut. The Germans firing from Mad Point, were forced to change targets to the 28th Brigade on the left which was attacking directly towards the point, which gave the battalion enough time to reach Fosse Trench at 7:10 a.m. The miners' cottages ahead had been captured by the right-hand battalion and by 7:45 a.m. the battalion reached Three Cabarets and Corons de Pekin to the north of the Dump. Many more casualties had been incurred by this battalion and a supporting battalion had advanced to reinforce it, which had then been caught by machine-guns firing from Mad Point and also had many casualties. The battalions at the objective were ordered to dig in and consolidate Corons Trench to cover Fosse 8, because the 2nd Division to the north had been repulsed from Auchy village. The alternative plan was implemented to form a defensive flank facing north-east from Fosse 8 to Haisnes village. A further advance towards Haisnes was made impossible, when the 28th Brigade was stopped in front of Madagascar ("Mad") Trench and the area around Fosse 8 was consolidated to be ready for a counter-attack from the north or the north-east.

Consolidation of Corons Trench was made difficult by the Germans, who had opened a sluice as they withdrew and flooded the trench knee-deep. The infantry and a field company dug a step above the water-level, as German troops in communication trenches nearby, inflicted many more casualties with machine-gun and rifle-fire. German artillery fired on the area from the vicinity of Haisnes until the British 9.2-inch howitzers, directed by observers on the Dump forced them out of action. By 10:30 a.m. consolidation was complete at the Dump, the fosse and Corons De Pekin. A telephone line was installed to brigade headquarters but was cut so often that only three messages were passed during the day. A line from the observers at the Dump to the heavy artillery, remained open all day. Four 2.75-inch Mountain guns were moved forward from Annequin at 9:15 a.m. and were ready to block a German advance from Auchy or Haisnes by 10:30 a.m.; a field artillery battery arrived soon after. The 28th Division (Major-General Edward Bulfin was sent to hold part of the line against German counter-attacks and a quarter of its men were killed in the following week. Bulfin later described the relentless struggle as a "nightmare". The German 14th Division was reinforced by the last two battalions of the II Bavarian Corps, known as Composite Bavarian Regiment (Staubwasser). During the day they were joined by the I Battalion, Saxon Infantry Regiment 104 of the 40th Division.

==== German 6th Army ====
A German attack on 29 September failed, due to a lack of hand grenades, after which they reorganised their troops. By this time major fighting over most of the rest of the Loos battlefield had come to an end. By 3 October had been fought back virtually to their initial position at the cost of thousands of lives and on 8 October the Guards Division was eventually able to repulse a German attack by the 123rd and 117th divisions and part of the 7th Division on the left flank. The German artillery preparation had been inaccurate due to fog and the German infantry were stopped by uncut wire and an alert British defence, assisted by French troops north of Hill 70, the German attackers losing 3,000 casualties. On 13 October the fresh 46th (North Midland) Division (TF) attacked after a cloud gas release. The division suffered a similar fate to the two German divisions on 8 October, losing 3,643 casualties, mostly in the first ten minutes. The gas clouds had little effect due to high winds and bright sunlight and artillery support had been minimal, due to a lack of ammunition.

== Aftermath ==
=== Analysis ===
The official history of the war suggested that "The fighting on the 13th–14th October had not improved the general situation in any way and had brought nothing but useless slaughter of infantry." General Sir Douglas Haig thought it might be possible to launch another attack on 7 November but heavy rain and accurate German shelling during the second half of October finally persuaded him to abandon the attempt.

=== Casualties ===
The 9th Division suffered 6,058 casualties and the 46th (North Midland) Division 3,763 men. The Guards Division had 2,115 casualties during the Battle of Loos. On 8 October, the German 123rd and 117th divisions suffered 3,000 casualties. During the Battle of Loos, the 117th Division suffered 6,572 casualties.

=== Subsequent operations ===
Over the winter months, the 170th Tunnelling Company RE dug several galleries under the German lines, in the Hohenzollern Redoubt area, which had changed hands several times since September 1915. In March 1916, the Germans had an unobstructed view of the British positions, from a slag heap named Fosse 8 and in previous mining operations, no man's land had become a crater field. The British front line was held by outposts, to reduce the number of troops vulnerable to mine explosions and the strain of knowing that the ground could erupt at any moment. The 12th (Eastern) Division was selected to conduct an attack, intended to capture the crater field, gain observation from crater lips over the German defences back to Fosse 8 and end the threat of German mine attacks.

Four mines, the largest yet sprung by the British, were detonated on 2 March, then followed up by two battalions of infantry, which captured the new craters, several German occupied craters, Triangle Crater that had been unknown to the British. The main entrance of the German mine galleries was discovered in the crater and the 170th Tunnelling Company crossed no man's land to demolish the entrance. German counter-attacks concentrated on the recovery of Triangle Crater, which was re-captured on 4 March. The recovery by the Germans of the gallery entrance threatened the positions captured by the British, who attacked Triangle Crater on 6 March but were repulsed. British tunnellers got into the German gallery system from a British tunnel and were able to demolish the system on 12 March, which relieved the threat of another German mine attack. Skirmishing around the craters diminished and it was thought that the Germans were concentrating on consolidating new positions.

On 18 March, the Germans surprised the British with five mines, which had been quietly dug through the clay layer above the chalk. The German attack had nearly as much success as the British attack on 2 March and forced back the British to the original front line, before local counter-attacks regained some of the craters. When the fighting died down after 19 March, both sides occupied the near lips of the craters. Brigadier-General Cator, the 37th Brigade commander, recommended that attempts to occupy craters should end and the near lips be held instead, because they were death traps against howitzer and mortar fire and because the expected observation from the crater lip, was obstructed by its convex shape and large lumps of chalk brought to the surface by the explosions.

== Victoria Cross ==
The following soldiers received the Victoria Cross in connection with operations at the Hohenzollern Redoubt:

- 13 October 1915: Corporal James Lennox Dawson (187th Company, Corps of Royal Engineers).
- 14 October 1915: Captain Geoffrey Vickers (The Sherwood Foresters).
- 27 September 1915: Corporal James Dalgleish Pollock (Queen's Own Cameron Highlanders).

== Order of battle ==
46th (North Midland) Division | Hohenzollern Redoubt 13–19 August 1915

Data taken from Edmonds, J. E. Military Operations France and Belgium 1915 volume II (1928) unless indicated.

137th Brigade (Staffordshire)

- 1/5th Battalion, The South Staffordshire Regiment
- 1/6th Battalion, The South Staffordshire Regiment
- 1/5th Battalion, North Staffordshire Regiment
- 1/6th Battalion, North Staffordshire Regiment

138th Brigade (Lincoln and Leicester)

- 1/4th Battalion, The Lincolnshire Regiment
- 1/5th Battalion, The Lincolnshire Regiment
- 1/4th Battalion, The Leicestershire Regiment
- 1/5th Battalion, The Leicestershire Regiment

139th Brigade (Nottinghamshire & Derbyshire)

- 1/5th Battalion, The Sherwood Foresters
- 1/6th Battalion, The Sherwood Foresters
- 1/7th Battalion, The Sherwood Foresters
- 1/8th Battalion, The Sherwood Foresters

Divisional Pioneers

- 1/1st Battalion The Monmouthshire Regiment

Royal Field Artillery

- I North Midland Brigade (1, 2 & 3 Lincolnshire Batteries)
- II North Midland Brigade (1, 2 & 3 Staffordshire Batteries)
- III North Midland Brigade (4, 5 & 6 Staffordshire Batteries)
- IV North Midland Brigade (1 & 2 Derbyshire Batteries)

Royal Engineers

- 1/1st North Midland Field Company
- 1/2nd North Midland Field Company
- 2/1st North Midland Field Company
