= Battle of Loos =

1915 offensive of World War I in France

- Part of the Western Front of the First World War
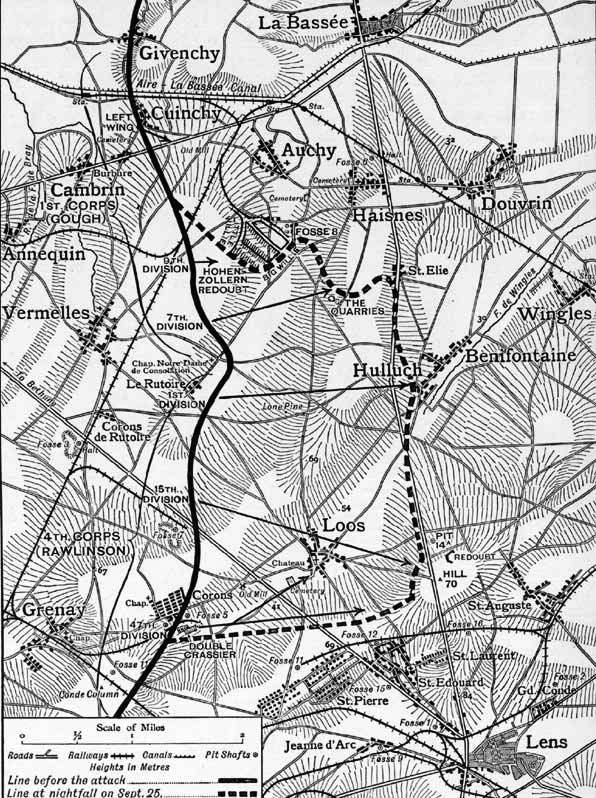
- Battle of Loos
Date	25 September – 8 October 1915 (1 week and 6 days)
Location	Loos, France 50°27′30″N 02°47′39″E
Result	German victory

Belligerents
British Empire; United Kingdom; India	German Empire

Commanders and leaders
Douglas Haig; Hubert Gough; Henry Rawlinson	Rupprecht, Crown Prince of Bavaria; Friedrich Sixt von Armin

Strength
6 divisions	3 divisions

Casualties and losses
59,247	c. 26,000

The Battle of Loos took place from 25 September to 8 October 1915 in France on the Western Front, during the First World War. It was the biggest British attack of 1915, the first time that the British used gas as a weapon and the first mass engagement of New Army divisions. The French and British tried to break through the German defences in Artois in the north and Champagne at the south end of the Noyon Salient, to restore a war of movement.

Despite improved methods, more ammunition, better equipment and gas, the Franco–British attacks were contained by the Germans, except for local losses of ground. The British gas attack failed sufficiently to neutralise the defenders and the artillery bombardment was too short to destroy barbed wire and machine-gun nests. German defensive fortifications and tactics could not be overcome by the British who were still assembling a mass army suitable for Western Front conditions.

== Background ==
After the First Battle of the Marne frustrated Germany's bold bid for victory in the West and France's efforts failed to take the war to the Germans in Alsace-Lorraine, stalemate ensued. During the first half of 1915 French and British efforts to break through the German defences had been costly failures. In December 1914 the professional head of the German army, Erich von Falkenhayn, had been obliged to withdraw some 14 divisions from the Western Front to reinforce the Eastern Front. The French commander, General Joseph Joffre, saw an opportunity to break through the German field fortifications. The British part would be an attack at the village of Loos.

Field Marshal Sir John French and Douglas Haig (GOC First Army), regarded the ground south of La Bassée Canal, which was overlooked by German-held slagheaps and colliery towers, as unsuitable for an attack, particularly given the discovery in July that the Germans were building a second defensive position behind the front position. At the Frévent Conference on 27 July, French failed to persuade Ferdinand Foch that an attack further north offered greater prospects for success. The debate continued into August, with Joffre siding with Foch and the British commanders being over-ruled by Herbert Kitchener, the British Secretary of State for War, on 21 August.

== Gas ==
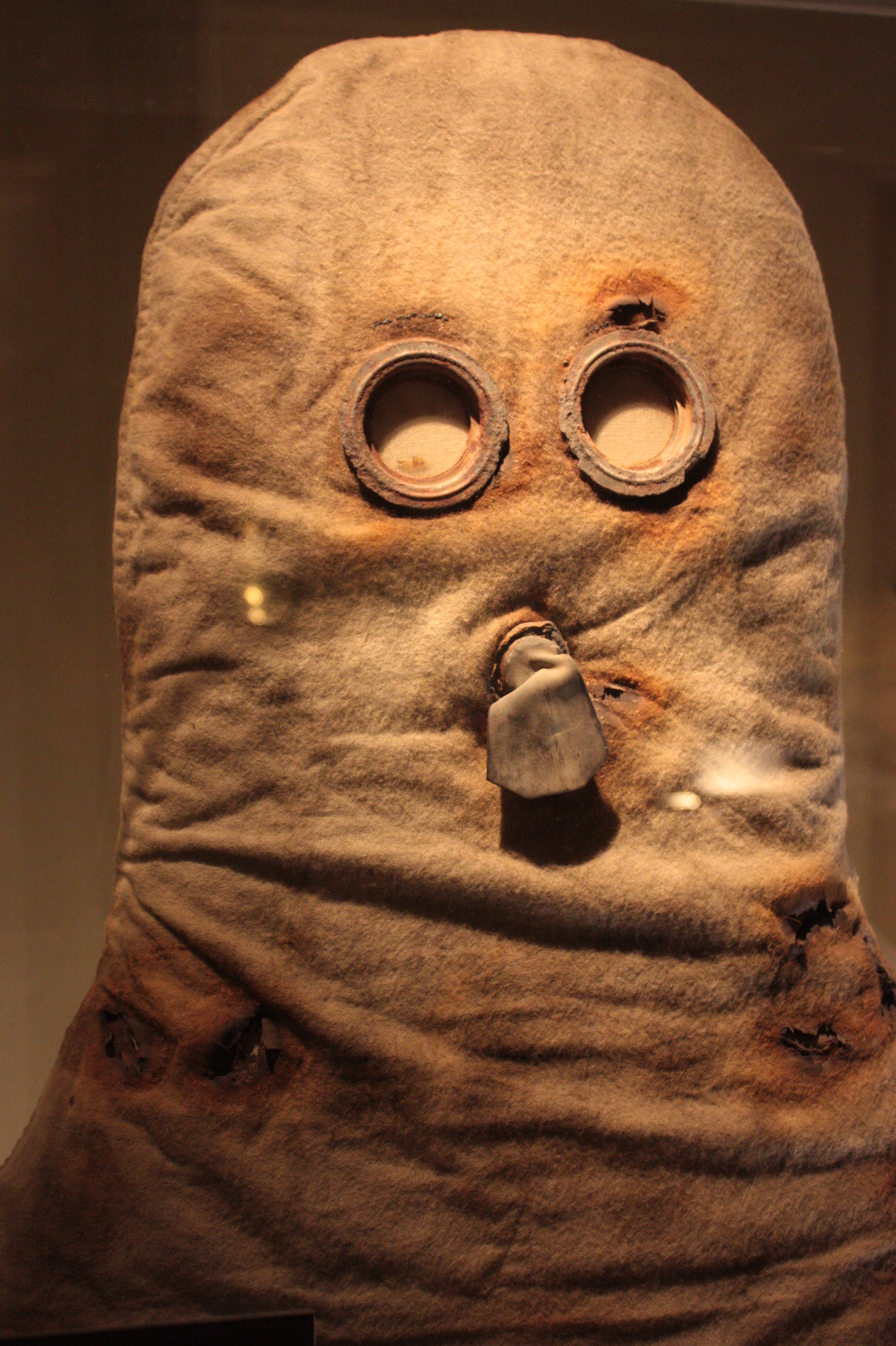
A World War I British gas hood c. 1915

There had been early ideas of how to use gas in the war. The British Government rejected this as it would contravene the spirit and the letters of the Hague Conventions of 1899 and 1907. If not technically outlawed, gas was felt to be unsporting. When the Germans at the Second Battle of Ypres on 22 April 1915 used gas for the first time in the war, the British had changed their minds. The decision to use gas as an offensive weapon was made on 3 May 1915, following instructions from French. G.H.Q. established a laboratory at Helfaut, near St Omer, with Special Companies of the Royal Engineers under Major Foulkes.

On 22 August, a demonstration of a chlorine wave was given at Helfaut, attracting General Haig and his corps and divisional commanders. The chlorine gas was contained in steel cylinders placed below the firing step of the front parapet of the fire trench. A flexible copper pipe connected the cylinder with an ordinary half-inch iron pipe, which was placed on the top of the parapet pointing towards the German trenches and weighted with sandbags. The cylinders functioned on the principle of a soda-water syphon, on opening the cock, the gas came out as a yellowish-white vapour, then a greenish-yellow cloud a few feet from the pipe. It was hoped that, given the greater density of the gas, it would descend into subterranean shelters such as the deep dug-outs of the German trenches and the cellars in the villages, where artillery fire could not penetrate.

The Germans would be forced into the open, unable to maintain stubborn resistance. In the event of the infantry assault being executed in immediate succession to the gas discharge, the probability of success would be significantly increased. The demonstration showed the importance of chlorine gas in offensive operations. General Haig was ordered to cooperate with General Joffre's plans and the gas demonstration led to the idea of using it on the attack front south of La Bassée canal.

== Prelude ==
=== British preparations ===
The battle was the third time that specialist Royal Engineer tunnelling companies were used to dig under no-man's-land, to plant mines under the parapets of the German front line trenches, ready to be detonated at zero hour.

=== Order of battle ===
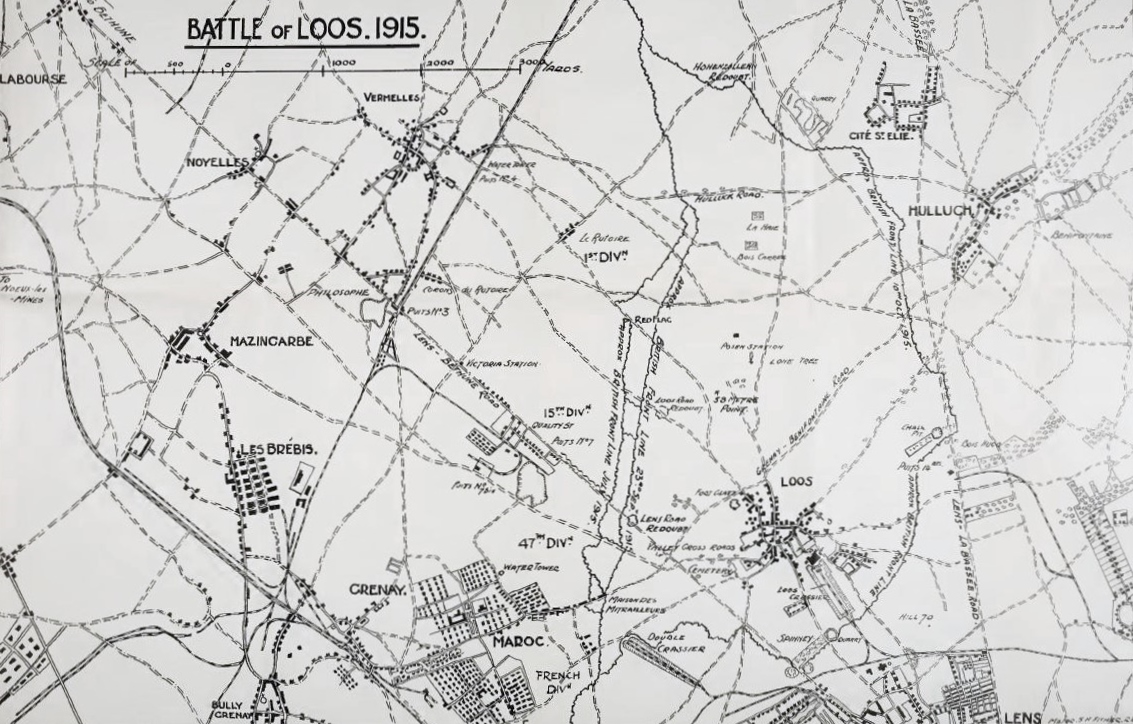
Battle of Loos, 1915

The forces deployed for the offensive consisted of two corps. I Corps (Lieutenant-General Hubert Gough) comprising the 2nd Division (Major-General Henry Horne), the 7th Division (Major-General Thompson Capper), the 9th (Scottish) Division (Major-General George Thesiger) and the 28th Division (Major-General Edward Bulfin). IV Corps (Lieutenant-General Sir Henry Rawlinson) comprised the 3rd Cavalry Division (Major-General Charles Briggs), the 1st Division (Major-General Arthur Holland), the 15th (Scottish) Division (Major-General Frederick McCracken) and the 47th (2nd London) Division TF (Major-General Charles Barter).

French decided to keep a reserve consisting of the Cavalry Corps, the Indian Cavalry Corps and XI Corps (Lieutenant-General Richard Haking), which consisted of the Guards Division and the New Army 21st Division (Major-General George Forestier-Walker) and 24th Division (Major-General John Capper) recently arrived in France and a corps staff (some of whom had never worked together or served on a staff before). Archibald Murray, the Deputy Chief of the Imperial General Staff (DCIGS) advised French that as recently trained troops, they were suited for the long marches of an exploitation rather than for trench warfare. French was doubtful that a breakthrough would be achieved. Haig and Foch, commander of the groupe des armées du nord (Northern Army Group), wanted the reserves closer, to exploit a breakthrough on the first day. French agreed to move the reserves nearer to the front but still thought they should not be committed until the second day.

The defence consisted of IV Corps (General Six von Armin) comprising the 117th Division (General Ernst Kuntze) the 8th Division (Major-General Thilo von Hanstein) the 7th Division (Lieutenant-General Johannes Riedel) and the 123rd (Saxson) Division (Major-General Karl Lucius). VII Corps (General Hermann von François) comprised the 14th Division (Major-General Constantin von Altrock). II Bavarian Corps (Lieutenant-General Otto von Stetten) comprising the 9th 17th and 18th Bavarian Infantry Divisions, the Guard Corps comprising the 1st Guard Division (Major-General Prince Eitel Friedrich of Prussia) and the 2nd Guard Division (Lieutenant-General Maximilian von Höhn). Additionally, there were the X Reserve Corps (General Robert Kosch) comprising the 2nd Guard Reserve Division (Lieutenant-General Paul Weese).

=== British plan ===
The IV Corps (Rawlinson) on the right of the First Army had as its first task the capture of the German frontline defences along the Grenay frontal arc between the Double Crassier (slagheap) and the Vermelles−Hulluch road. The British advance was to be continued by the 15th (Scottish) Division and the 1st Division. On the right, the 47th (1/2nd London) Division, was to stop along the Loos valley between the Double Crassier and the Loos Crassier (both included) and form a defensive flank, including the "chalk pit", opposite Lens. The 15th (Scottish) Division and 1st Division were to advance over Hill 70 and the Lens road through the second German position between St Auguste and Hulluch to the line of the Haute Deule canal. The right of the 15th (Scottish) Division was to meet the French Tenth Army advancing south of Lens on the Lens−Carvin road, a few miles east of St Auguste; the Lens–Henin–Lietard road was made the boundary between the French and British. Rawlinson was under the impression that French expected a breakthrough and would have his reserves nearby to exploit it.

The IV Corps attack was to be pushed to the utmost extent, with no corps reserve. The artillery of IV Corps was to support the advance and adapt to it as soon as possible. The artillery of the 47th (1/2nd London) Division, reinforced by 1 Group Honourable Artillery Regiment was to advance and form a pivot on the right around Mazingarbe (1.5 mi (2.4 km) north-northwest of Grenay) and Les Brebis (0.99 mi (1.6 km) northwest of Grenay), facing Lens, ready to eliminate the German batteries at Lens. The artillery of the 15th (Scottish) Division was to advance to positions close behind the original British front-line trenches and form a strong centre between North Maroc and Fosse 7 near the Bethune–Lens road, where the batteries would be covered by the crest of the Grenay spur. The artillery of the 1st Division was to advance via Le Rutoire (south-east of Vermelles) and take up a position 0.99 mi (1.6 km) north of Loos near the Vermelles–Hulluch road behind the British front line.

I Corps (Gough) was to break through the German first defensive system between the Vermelles–Hulluch road and the La Bassée canal with its 7th Division, 9th (Scottish) Division and the 2nd Division. The plan was to advance eastward across the plain to the German second defensive line, located a mile beyond and to continue without pause toward the Haute Deule canal. This strategy aimed to capitalise on the element of surprise and prevent the German reserves from reinforcing their rear defences. The 7th Division and 9th (Scottish) Division were to breach the German second line along the Hulluch–Haisnes front and proceed towards Wingles and Douvrin, respectively. The 7th Division's right flank was to move along the Vermelles–Hulluch–Pont-à-Vendin road, maintaining contact with IV Corps. The 2nd Division, on the left, was assigned to capture Auchy village and secure the railway running north-west from Haisnes to the canal, forming a defensive flank to support the further advance of the 7th Division and the 9th (Scottish) Division. To bolster the left flank, east of Haisnes, the 9th (Scottish) Division was instructed to deploy a small mobile flank guard. No corps reserve was allocated, as it was expected that XI Corps with the 21st Division and the 24th Division would arrive promptly.

An alternative plan was devised in case the 2nd Division failed to break through. It was acknowledged that capturing Auchy posed significant challenges, given the limited bombardment and the reliance on favourable wind conditions to carry gas into the village cellars and dugouts. If the assault on Auchy did not succeed, the 2nd Division was to hold its position, while the 9th (Scottish) Division created the defensive flank by occupying a line from the northern edge of Fosse 8, following a German communication trench known as Pekin Alley, extending eastward to Haisnes. Under this contingency, the 7th Division alone would continue the advance to the Haute Deule canal. As with the IV Corps front, the German force immediately available to counter I Corps was limited, consisting of Reserve Infantry Regiment 11, Infantry Regiment 16 and Infantry Regiment 56.

== Battle ==
=== 25 September ===
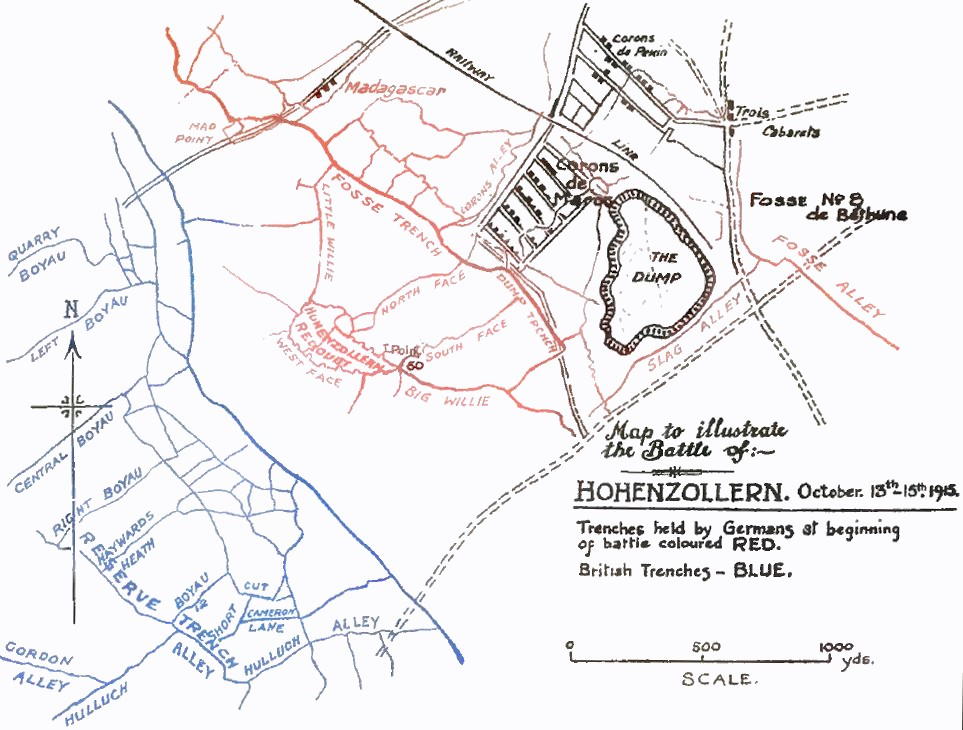
Map, Hohenzollern Redoubt, October 1915

In many places British artillery had failed to cut the German wire. The engineers manning the chlorine gas cylinders warned against their use, because of the weakness and unpredictability of the wind but they were overruled by Gough. In some places the gas drifted back into the British lines and caused more British than German casualties.

==== IV Corps ====
At 6.30 a.m., forty minutes after the gas attack began, the 140th and 141st Brigades of the 47th (1/2nd London) Division began their advance. The gas had spread best in this sector, possibly due to the slope of the terrain towards the Loos valley. The advance was also obscured by a thick cloud of smoke from two batteries of Stokes mortars. As soon as the gas reached the German positions, they opened fire, which subsided shortly afterwards. Within a few minutes, both brigades penetrated the front trench behind the smoke and gas curtain; shortly afterwards the resistance collapsed. By 7:30 a.m., the 7th and 6th Battalions (City of London Regiment) had reached the 140th Brigade objective, the German support trench from the centre of the spoil heaps to the Bethune–Lens road. There was a German counter-attack on the right flank of the 7th Battalion but it was repulsed.

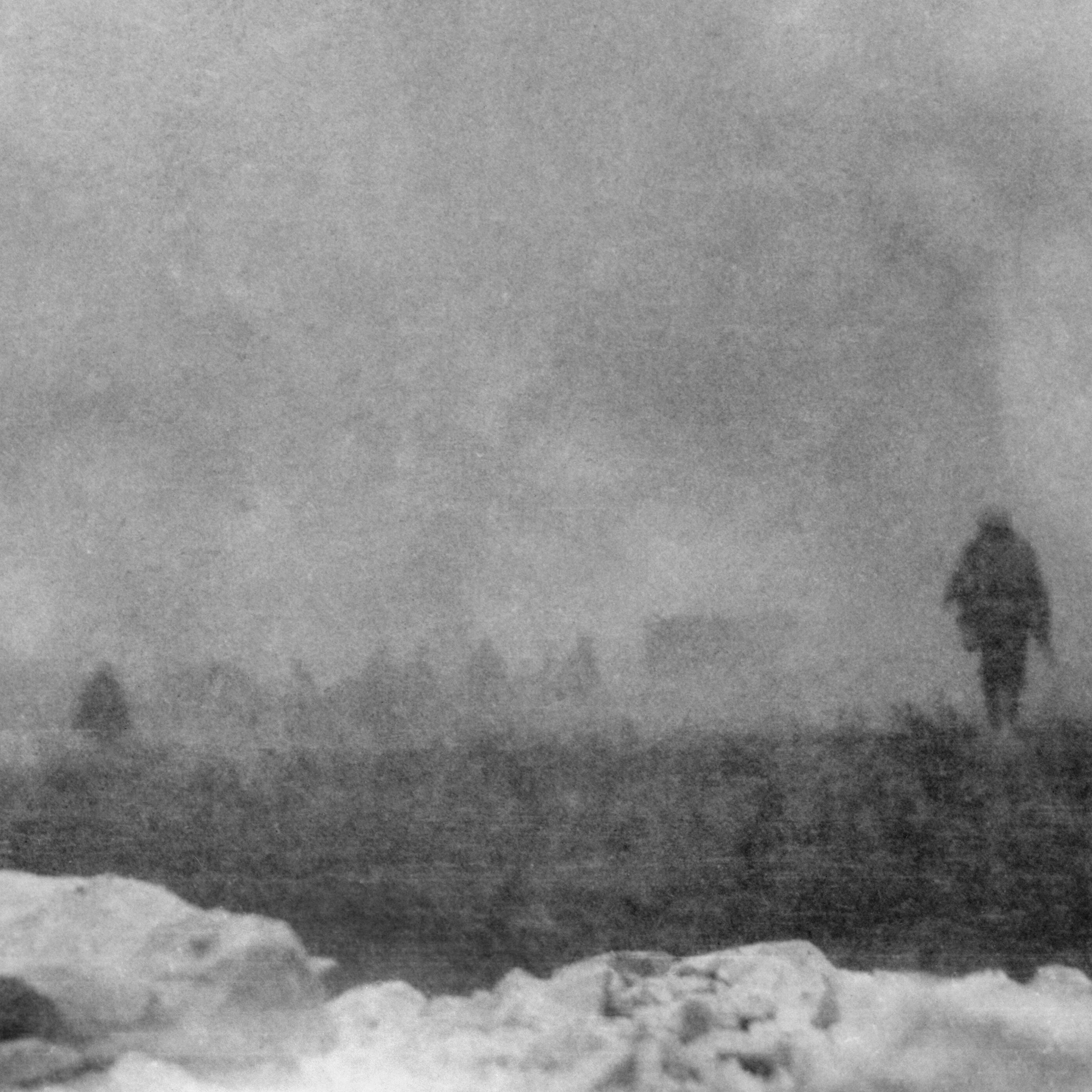
British infantry from the 47th (1/2nd London) Division advancing into a gas cloud during the Battle of Loos

North of the Bethune-Lens road, the 141st Brigade with the 18th Battalion reached the Loos defensive trench and halted there. The 20th and 19th Battalions of the City of London Regiment crossed the trench towards the residential areas of Loos. The 20th Battalion advanced quickly, occupied the garden city and, after a determined resistance by the Germans the chalk pit and the northern end of a copse were captured. A trench at the southern end of the copse could not be taken due to a lack of ammunition. At 9:30 a.m., the 20th Battalion, supported by the 17th Battalion, reported that the chalk pit had been secured and almost all objectives had been achieved. The 19th Battalion reached the northern end of the slagheap cleared obstacles, captured the mine buildings and advanced south-east of the slagheap to a terrace with a clear field of fire but stopped before the ridge. Parts of the battalion advancing towards Puits 15 via the village of Loos were dispersed by the 15th (Scottish) Division. Some units gathered in Loos, others continued to fight on Hill 70. In the end, only a platoon of the 20th Battalion and parts of the 19th Battalion held positions on and north of the dump, reinforced by reserves of the 17th Battalion.

The advance of the 15th (Scottish) Division was for the 44th Brigade to make the direct assault; the 46th Brigade, on the left, was to attack on the north side of the village and the 45th Brigade was held in divisional reserve. The gas attack was delivered about ten minutes to six. The wind was very light, and the cloud clung too close to the ground. The breeze came from the south-west, Loos lies in a hollow and a breeze tends to eddy into a hollow, the gas blew back to some extent on the 46th Brigade on the left. The cloud was greeted with a fusillade of rifle and machine-gun fire, but as it passed over the enemy trenches the fire slackened. At 6:30 a.m. the Highlanders attacked.

Shortly before the attackers reached the remnants of the German barbed wire the German defenders opened fire and caused severe casualties amongst the British infantry but the Germans were forced back towards Lens. Despite stubborn resistance, Loos was taken by the British shortly after 8:00 a.m. The 46th Brigade advanced further north, reaching the trench line east of the road between Grenay and Hulluch around 7:30 a.m. before advancing across the open valley north of Loos. At 9:15 a.m. the brigade reached the road to Lens. The reserve battalions of the 44th and 46th Brigades were sent forward. The 10th Battalion of the Gordon Highlanders reached the new front line at Loos, while the 8th Battalion of the K.O.S.B. was ordered to maintain the advance. The fighting in Loos concentrated the mass of the two brigades on a narrow front of about 2,000 ft (600 m). At shortly after 8:00 a.m. they began the ascent of Hill 70, encountering little resistance.

At about 9:30 a.m. the Royal Engineers began preparing paths for the field artillery. Divisional orders stated that the first brigade to reach Hill 70 was to deploy a sufficient force to secure the hill until reinforcements arrived, while the rest of the troops were to advance against the German positions at St Auguste. About 900 British troops crossed Hill 70 and advanced towards the second German position at St Laurent while the rest advanced towards St Auguste. The Germans received reinforcements around 11:30 a.m. and counter-attacked to encircle the British at St Laurent. The 9th Battalion of the Black Watch was able to hold off the initial attack but more German reinforcements arrived around noon and the British line came under severe fire.

At 1:00 p.m., the Germans counter-attacked again and recaptured the Hill 70 redoubt. From there, they controlled the surrounding terrain, including the Lens–La Bassée road and the village of Loos. The reserve of the 15th (Scottish) Division, the 45th Brigade (Brigadier-General Francis Wallerstein) was sent to Loos to reinforce the left flank of the 46th Brigade. This flank was dangerously exposed due to the lack of an advance by the 1st Division. The battalions of the 45th Brigade, including the 18th Battalion of the Royal Scots and the 11th Battalion of the Argyll and Sutherland Highlanders, advanced through Loos towards Saint-Auguste but did not arrive there until after 1:00 p.m., when the Germans had already recaptured Hill 70. Without strong artillery support, a renewed attack on the hill was impossible. By nightfall both the 47th and 15th Divisions found themselves on a line between the German first and second defensive positions, from the Double Crassier to Chalk Pit Wood, along the western slope of the Cite spur which bounds the Loos valley on the south.

==== I Corps ====
At 6.30 simultaneously with the Divisions of IV Corps the 9th (Scottish) Division made for Fosse 8 and the Hohenzollern Redoubt. On the extreme left the fire from the rise at Auchy La Bassee enfiladed the advance, and the 28th Brigade had desperate fighting. They pushed beyond the Vermelles-La Bassee railway, and took the first line of the German trenches. The position was too precarious to hold and slowly during the day the Lowlanders were driven back. The 26th Highland Brigade had more success with the Hohenzollern Redoubt. Saps had been run up to within a short distance of it and the artillery bombardment had played havoc with the interior of the redoubt. It was captured in a costly success and the 5th Battalion (Cameron Highlander Regiment) and the 7th Battalion (Seaforth Highlanders Regiment), with the 8th Battalion (Black Watch Regiment) in support, captured Fosse 8 against determined resistance. They had to advance over a perfectly bare, shell-swept piece of ground; the machine guns on the Fosse caused many casualties; and, owing to the hold-up of the advance on their left, their flank was in the air. The 27th Brigade was brought up, and was employed to clear the maze of trenches and cottages to the east of Fosse 8. By noon this section of the British line had driven forward in a broad salient, capturing the chief works of the defenders. Fosse 8 was cleared but not occupied in strength, and all the land between it and Haisnes was filled with isolated small forts and sections of trenches still held by German machine guns.

On the right of the 9th (Scottish) Division the 7th Division had made good progress. With no Fosse or redoubt to hold them back, they swept forward across the first German position. They reached the western side of the Quarries, where a sector of the German second line, strongly posted, held up that part of the advance. Their van entered the village of St Elie, and then pushed northwards, and by ten o'clock in the forenoon had actually reached the village of Haisnes. Had the advance been made in greater strength it might, have caught between two fires the Germans still clinging to the eastern skirts of Fosse 8 and the Holhenzollern redoubt. As it was, the extreme ground won could not be maintained. The hold on Haisnes slackened, and by midday the line of the 7th Division ran from the western end of St Elie to the west side of the Quarries, and so north to the right of the 9th Division east of the Hohenzollern redoubt. The British held a trench line at the Quarries looking across to the German position on the other side, while between them at the bottom of the hole lay a German howitzer battery, which they could not get near enough to destroy or prevent the enemy using.

=== 26–28 September ===
==== 21st Division and 24th Division ====
The general reserve was prepared for the battle north and south of Lillers. It consisted of the Cavalry Corps (1st, 2nd and 3rd Cavalry Divisions) and the XI Corps (Guards Division, 21st Division and 24th Division), which marched to the area from the divisional concentration areas west of St Omer. XI Corps began its advance on 20 September, with the 21st Division marching from its billets north-west of St Omer via Aire and the 24th Division from billets south-west of St Omer. The Guards Division followed in several columns a day later. The movement was carried out at night to avoid enemy aircraft observation, with troops resting in billets during the day. On the first two nights, over 20 mi (32 km) were covered and the Guards Division was billeted west of the town. The 3rd Cavalry Division, allotted to the First Army as Army cavalry, moved to the Bois des Dames, while the rest of the Cavalry Corps was concentrated around Therouanne.

Marching orders did not reach XI Corps until 2:00 a.m and both divisions did not reach their final position for the night until even later. The 21 Division battalions detached to the 15th (Scottish) Division, arrived in the battle area after being informed of their presence at Hill 70. Brigadier General Wilkinson sent two battalions to reinforce. The 8th Battalion East Yorkshire Regiment and 10th Battalion Green Howards marched down the Lens road, crossing the old British front line. They were bombarded by German artillery in St Pierre, resulting in casualties and destruction of their transport.

Two battalions intended to attack Hill 70, were disorientated and moved instead south of Loos village. They encountered machine-gun fire from Chalk Pit Copse and British troops in Loos Cemetery. The 12th and 13th battalions of the 62nd Brigade, along with Brigade HQ, arrived in Loos village. Brigadier General Wilkinson sent one company of the 12 Northumberland to Hill 70, which was assumed to be a general relief. The two battalions on the hill, the 9th Black Watch and 10th Gordon Highlanders, withdrew, leaving the Northumberland company the only British troops on the approaches. The last battalion of the 62nd Brigade, the 13th Northumberland, was sent to assist the 46th Brigade, where some units assumed a general relief and began to withdraw. Control on the 15th (Scottish) Division front was lost during the night and the line reached during the day was much weaker than it should have been.

During the night the Germans launched two counter-attacks on the 7th Royal Scots Fusiliers, one of the battalions of the 45th Brigade that the commander of the 15th (Scottish) Division had deployed to hold Loos after his other two brigades had taken it. Both were beaten off. The situation around Loos and Hill 70 and the right flank of First Army did not change very much throughout the night. This was not so elsewhere on the British front. The 73rd Brigade, 9th (Scottish) Division, assembled in the original British front line and relieved the 26th Brigade at Fosse 8, crossing German trench lines in failing light and rain. The relief was delayed until the Germans counter-attack on 26 September but the fosse was held. A methodical counter-attack by a reinforced German division pushed the British back into the German Gun Trench, capturing The Quarries and Brigadier General Bruce. The British managed to halt further progress but had to establish a line 500 yd (460 m) back.

Before the general advance could begin hill 70 had to be retaken. General Rawlinson, allocated the task to the 15th (Scottish) Division, with zero hour at 9:00 a.m. after an hour-long bombardment. The commander of the 15th (Scottish) Division in turn gave the job to the 45 th Brigade and the 62nd Brigade (on loan from the 21st Division) the orders arriving at both brigade headquarters at around 5:00 a.m. on 26 September. After the artillery bombardment ended the 45th Brigade would make an attack astride the track which ran just south of east from Loos to the La Bassée–Lens road, followed up by the 62nd Brigade. Once Hill 70 and its redoubt had been taken, the troops would be responsible for digging in and facing south and south-east to prevent any interference with the attack to its north.

The artillery plan to support the attack included two field batteries and two howitzer batteries which had come forward during the night and were now at the cemetery just west of Loos. Due to severe delays, the battalion commanders received their instructions at around 8:00 a.m. After the artillery bombardment, the three battalions of the 45th Brigade moved forward, despite casualties on the approach. They managed to kill some German defenders and drive more out and back towards their second line. The attackers were unable to force the defenders out of the central part of the redoubt, leading to increased German artillery and mortar fire from St Auguste, St Emile and Hill 70. As the toll of dead and injured attackers increased, the survivors of the 45th Brigade were forced to abandon the redoubt and fall back to the western slopes.

The 12th Northumberland Fusiliers and 10th Green Howards of the 62nd Brigade, following up 200 yd (180 m) behind the 45th Brigade, had problems caused by bad light and inadequate maps and diverged to the right and began to attack Loos Crassier. Once the error was realised the commanding officers regained direction and the two battalions reached the ridge and swept over it, either side of the Hill 70 Redoubt. They still could not take the redoubt, and they were soon driven back to the western slopes.

The attempt to neutralise Hill 70 before the main attack had failed but Haking decided to press on. He thought that the main attack on the German second line would perforce outflank Hill 70, which would be rendered useless. Phase Two of the operation required the attacking infantry of the 21st division and the 24th Divisions on a frontage of just under 1 mi (1.6 km) to ascend a gently rising slope for about 1,000 yd (910 m) when they would come upon the German second line of defence consisting of only one trench, without the usual support or reserve lines but it was strongly held and well protected. Reinforcements had arrived during the night and they had thrown up a barbed wire entanglement 4 ft (1.2 m) high × 20 ft (6.1 m) deep. There would be a preliminary artillery bombardment lasting an hour.

During the night, the artillery struggled to advance beyond the western side of Le Rutoir, causing the guns to be visible to the Germans. Despite attempts to camouflage them, the Germans could bring down counter-battery fire from their artillery and receive infantry rifle fire. The bombardment was less effective than planned and little damage was done to the German trench before infantry advanced. During the final preparations for the attack, the Germans counter-attacked Bois Hugo, causing chaos for the British. The 12th Battalion, West Yorkshire Regiment, broke and ran back, leading to the death of Brigadier General Nickalls. A battalion from the 64th Brigade opened fire on the retreating British soldiers but the fourth battalion held their ground and shot down the advancing German troops.

At 11:00 a.m., two battalions of the 24th Division moved across the La Bassée–Lens road, reaching their objectives quickly. The German survivors were driven off, helping to steady the troops of the 21st Division. The attack on Hulluch, was uncoordinated and half-hearted, failing to capture or mask it. The divisional frontage was filled with gaps and the six battalions of the division were left with survivors only 50 yd (46 m) from the Germans second line. The German second line was protected by wire and the infantry suffered from artillery bombardment. The advance was stopped due to fire from both sides. On the right, the 21st Division faced worse conditions, with orders not reaching some battalions until Zero Hour. The division had already suffered many losses capturing Hill 70 and repelling the German counter-attack. The few soldiers who managed to get near the German line were unable to pass through the wire.

On the 24th Division front, no advance was possible due to the troops being isolated in front of the German trench. Both divisions retreated to the Grenay–Hulluch road and the old German front line, where a few officers and senior NCOs rallied the remnants of the two divisions. Despite the Germans re-occupying Hill 70 and the redoubt, the 15th (Scottish) Division was dug in on the western slopes. As casualties increased, ammunition ran short and supplies could not be got forward. At 1:00 p.m. troops on Hill 70 began to retreat towards Loos. Communication had broken down and battalions debated whether to retire to the old German trenches or give up Loos. The 7th Royal Scots Fusiliers remained east of Loos until they were the only battalion on the approaches to Hill 70. They met the 6th Cavalry Brigade, who had instructions to take any 15th (Scottish) Division troops in Loos. The 3rd Dragoon Guards and 1st Royal Dragoons were equivalent to one infantry battalion but managed to rally many of the 15th (Scottish) Division troops, reoccupying the trenches on Hill 70 by 8:00 p.m.

==== Guards Division ====
When the news of what was happening to the 21st Division and the 24th Division was brought home to the Army Commander, there was only the Guards Division as reserve available to him. Earlier in the morning, when the attempt to capture Hill 70 had failed, Haking had ordered the Guards Division to move to positions between Le Rutoir−Loos and Vermelles−Hulluch roads. Traffic chaos delayed the order, causing trouble for the 21st Division and the 24th Division. Haking sent another order to the Guards to continue to the old German front line and strengthen their position. Congested roads, desultory German shelling and battlefield confusion delayed the arrival of the Guards at the British jumping-off line until 6:00 p.m. The Guards began to reverse the captured German trenches. Major General Earl of Cavan sent orders to the Guards Division to relieve the 21st Division and the 24th Division during the night. The Guards took up their new position, allowing the remnants of the two New Army divisions to be withdrawn. By 6:00 a.m. on 27 September, the 1st Guards Brigade had the 3rd Coldstream on the left, the 1st Division, and the 2nd Coldstream on its right, covering a frontage of 1,400 yd (1,300 m) from Hulluch to Lone Tree. The brigade's sector ran south-west for 1,800 yd (1,600 m) to Fort Glatz, a redoubt on the old German Loos defences.

The Guards were to consolidate the British line to renew the attack. Orders were given to Haking and Cavan, who ordered the Guards Division to attack and capture the Chalk Pits, Puits 14 and Hill 70. The Germans counter-attacked Fosse 8 and The Dump, recapturing them. The Guards would have needed the support of their own artillery and the 21st Division and the 24th Division artilleries. There was insufficient ammunition and the bombardment was sparse. The news of the loss of the Dump and Fosse 8 further undermined the British offensive. The brigade commander decided to abandon the Dump and Fosse trenches and establish a new line east of the Hohenzollern Redoubt. Major-General George Thesiger, commander of the 9th (Scottish) Division, was killed while assessing the situation. The 28th Division moved to the battle area but too late to save Fosse 8. Major General Butler informed Haig, who ordered the attack to be cancelled.

On the left, the 2nd Guards Brigade, led by the 2nd Irish Guards and supported by the 1st Coldstream, attacked the Chalk Pit, while the 1st Scots Guards attacked to capture Puits 14, with the 3rd Grenadier Guards in reserve. The Chalk Pit was quickly seized but the advance on Puits 14 faced massed machine-gun fire. Despite reinforcements, including the 4th Grenadier Guards, the Scots Guards suffered severe casualties and could not hold the position. A temporary firing line was established from the Chalk Pit to Loos. Cavan ordered the 3rd Guards Brigade to delay its assault on Hill 70 until Puits 14 was secured but Brigadier General Frederick Heyworth mistakenly assumed Puits 14 had been captured due to a brief British occupation.

The 4th Grenadier Guards, 1st Welsh Guards, 2nd Scots Guards, and 1st Grenadier Guards of the 4th Brigade advanced through Loos under severe artillery fire. As confusion from gas shells disrupted their movement, two companies of the 4th Grenadiers joined the 2nd Brigade at Puits 14 by mistake. At 5:30 p.m., the 1st Welsh Guards attacked Hill 70 but were stopped at the crest under machine-gun fire from Puits 14 and the hill's redoubt. Despite their efforts, the Welsh and Grenadiers could not capture the position. By nightfall, the British line had strengthened, securing Loos and linking with cavalry on the right and the Loos–Hulluch Road on the left. The 47th (1/2nd London) Division captured Chalk Pit Copse, while a 7th Division counter-attack on The Quarries was a costly failure. Later attacks, including one led by the 2nd Worcester, also fell short, General Capper being killed during the assault. On the night of 27 September, Cavan and his brigade commanders agreed that further attempts on Hill 70 would be futile, though the First Army insisted on attacking Puits 14 again. French, noting the lack of reserves and vulnerability of the British right flank, coordinated with General Joffre and General Foch for French forces to relieve the 47th (1/2nd London) Division and strengthen the line. French told Foch on 28 September, that a gap could be "rushed" just north of Hill 70, although Foch felt that this would be difficult to co-ordinate and Haig told him that the First Army was in no position for further attacks. A lull fell on 28 September, with the British back on their start lines.

==== 3–13 October ====
The Germans made several attempts to recapture the Hohenzollern Redoubt, which they accomplished on 3 October. On 8 October, the Germans attempted to recapture much of the remaining lost ground by attacking with five regiments around Loos and against part of the 7th Division on the left flank. Foggy weather inhibited observation, the artillery preparation was inadequate and the British and French defenders were well prepared behind intact wire. The German attack was repulsed with 3,000 casualties but managed to disrupt British attack preparations, causing a delay until the night of 12/13 October. The British made a final attack on 13 October, which failed due to a lack of hand grenades. Haig thought it might be possible to launch another attack on 7 November but the combination of heavy rain and accurate German shelling during the second half of October persuaded him to abandon the attempt.

=== Air operations ===
The Royal Flying Corps (RFC) came under the command of Brigadier-General Hugh Trenchard. The 1st, 2nd and 3rd wings under Colonels Edward Ashmore, John Salmond and Sefton Brancker participated. As the British were short of artillery ammunition, the RFC flew target identification sorties prior to the battle, to ensure that shells were not wasted. During the first few days of the attack, target-marking squadrons equipped with better wireless transmitters, helped to direct British artillery onto German targets. Later in the battle, pilots carried out a tactical bombing operation for the first time in history. Aircraft of the 2nd and 3rd wings dropped many 100 lb (45 kg) bombs on German troops, trains, rail lines and marshalling yards. As the land offensive stalled, British pilots and observers flew low over German positions, providing target information to the artillery.

== Aftermath ==
=== Analysis ===
Rawlinson wrote to the King's adviser Arthur Bigge (28 September)

From what I can ascertain, some of the divisions did actually reach the enemy's trenches, for their bodies can now be seen on the barbed wire.

Major-General Richard Hilton, at that time a Forward Observation Officer, said of the battle,

A great deal of nonsense has been written about Loos. The real tragedy of that battle was its nearness to complete success. Most of us who reached the crest of Hill 70, and survived, were firmly convinced that we had broken through on that Sunday, 26th September 1915. There seemed to be nothing ahead of us, but an unoccupied and incomplete trench system. The only two things that prevented our advancing into the suburbs of Lens were, firstly, the exhaustion of the "Jocks" themselves (for they had undergone a bellyfull [sic] of marching and fighting that day) and, secondly, the flanking fire of numerous German machine-guns, which swept that bare hill from some factory buildings in Cite St Auguste to the south of us. All that we needed was more artillery ammunition to blast those clearly-located [sic] machine-guns, plus some fresh infantry to take over from the weary and depleted "Jocks". But, alas, neither ammunition nor reinforcements were immediately available, and the great opportunity passed.

— Richard Hilton

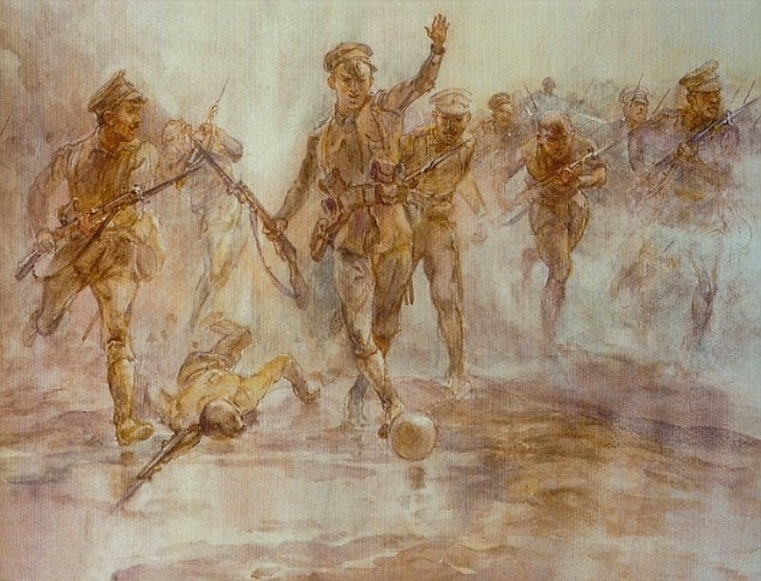
A London Irish at Loos (Elizabeth Thompson) Shows Rifleman Frank Edwards leading the charge while kicking a football.

French had been criticised before the battle and lost his remaining support in the government and army due to the British failure and a belief that he handled poorly the reserve divisions. French was replaced by Haig as Commander-in-chief (C-in-C) of the British Expeditionary Force (BEF) on 15 December 1915. Haig's account of the Battle of Loos, which gained widespread support, was detailed in a letter sent to Kitchener four days after the battle began. Haig emphasised the importance of having a sufficient reserve close to the rear of his attacking divisions. He claimed that the enemy had no troops in the second line, which some of his troops managed to enter without opposition. The two reserve divisions were instructed to join Haig as soon as the 1st Army's success was known at GHQ but they crossed their trench lines at 6:00 p.m., 12 hours before the capture of Loos, which would have allowed the reserves to be at hand.

Haig's letter addresses matters regarding the handling of reserves during the battle, emphasising the principle of keeping 20 per cent of a force in reserve. At Loos, this was particularly important as the French attack on the British right flank was delayed and conducted at an angle, creating a gap vulnerable to German counter-attacks. Haig claimed that the 21st Division and 24th Division, positioned as he requested 4.5 mi (7.2 km) from the front line, could have been decisive between 9:00 a.m. and 11:00 a.m. if deployed sooner. This assertion is flawed, as soldiers laden with equipment could not advance more than a mile an hour. Damaged communication lines and the reliance on precise meteorological conditions for the release of chlorine gas, made timely coordination impossible. These factors undermine Haig's claims, which appear to reflect his fear of being blamed for failure.

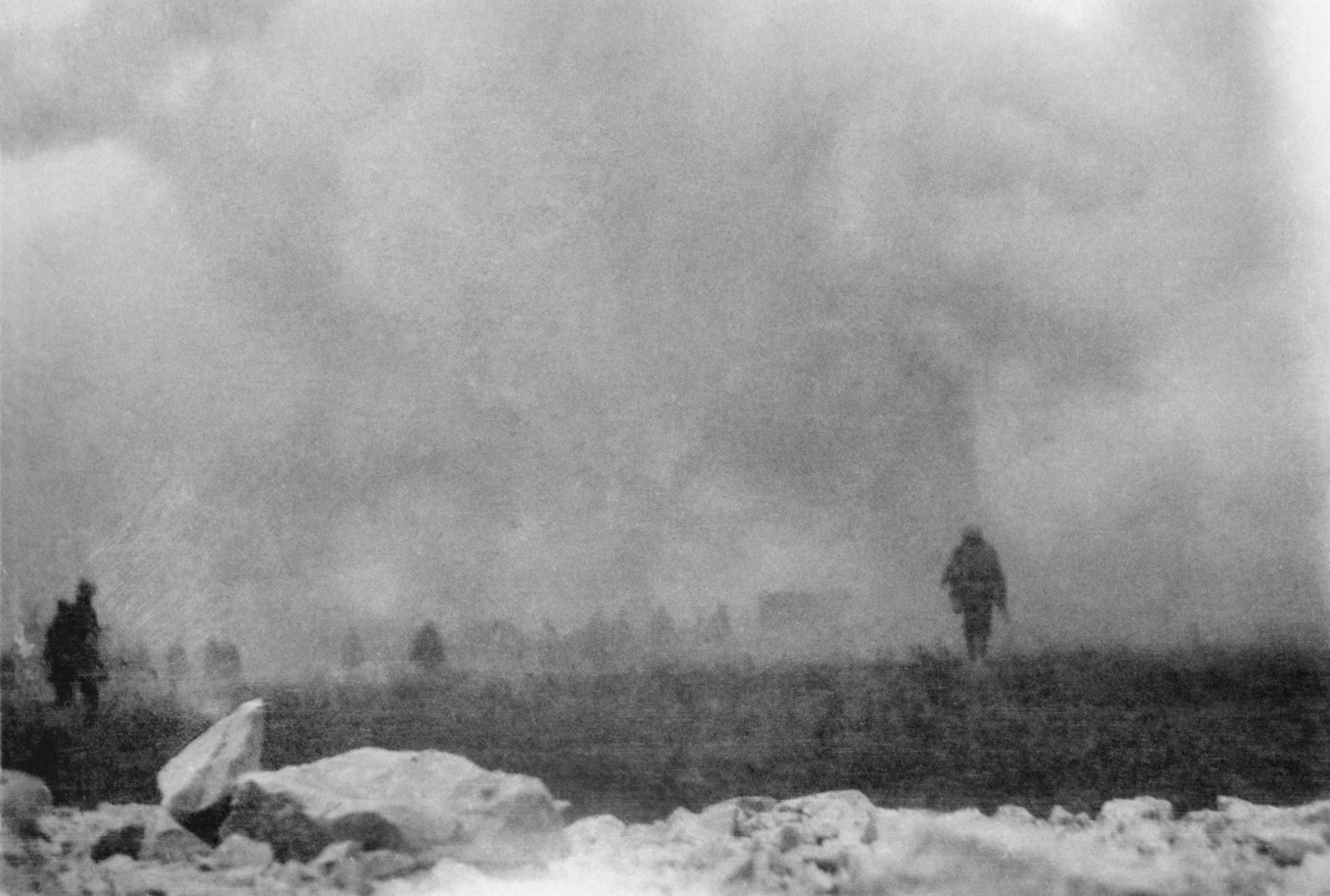
British infantry advancing through gas at Loos, 25 September 1915.

There is ambiguity regarding the time that Haig assumed control of the reserves, with conflicting reports suggesting times between 9:00 a.m. and 1:20 p.m. This debate diverts attention from how Haig used the reserves. His order to attack, issued at 11:30 a.m., reached the divisions only at 1:00 a.m. the next day, leading to a poorly coordinated assault on exposed terrain. Hill 70 and Hulluch village were not secured and troops believed they were moving into reserve rather than attacking trenches covered by machine-guns. Early morning mist further hampered artillery support, resulting in losses of 8,000 men within the first hour. The Germans, horrified by the scale of the slaughter, ceased fire out of compassion. In his correspondence, Haig blamed the reserves' poor quality and fatigue for the failure, criticising French for delaying their deployment and their inexperience. Haig failed to acknowledge the broader strategic and supply failures that contributed to the disaster.

=== Casualties ===
British casualties suffered in the main attack were 48,367 and they suffered 10,880 more in the subsidiary attack, a total of 59,247 of the 285,107 British casualties on the Western Front in 1915. Major-General George Thesiger (9th [Scottish] Division), Thompson Capper (7th Division) and Frederick Wing (12th (Eastern) Division) were killed. James Edmonds, the British official historian, gave German losses in the period 21 September – 10 October as c. 26,000 of c. 141,000 casualties on the Western Front during the autumn offensives in Artois and Champagne. In Der Weltkrieg, the German official account, 6th Army casualties are given as 29,657 to 21 September; by the end of October losses had risen to 51,100 and total German casualties suffered in the autumn battle (Herbstschlacht) in Artois and Champagne, were given as 150,000 men. About 26,000 of the German casualties were attributable to the Battle of Loos.

== Commemoration ==
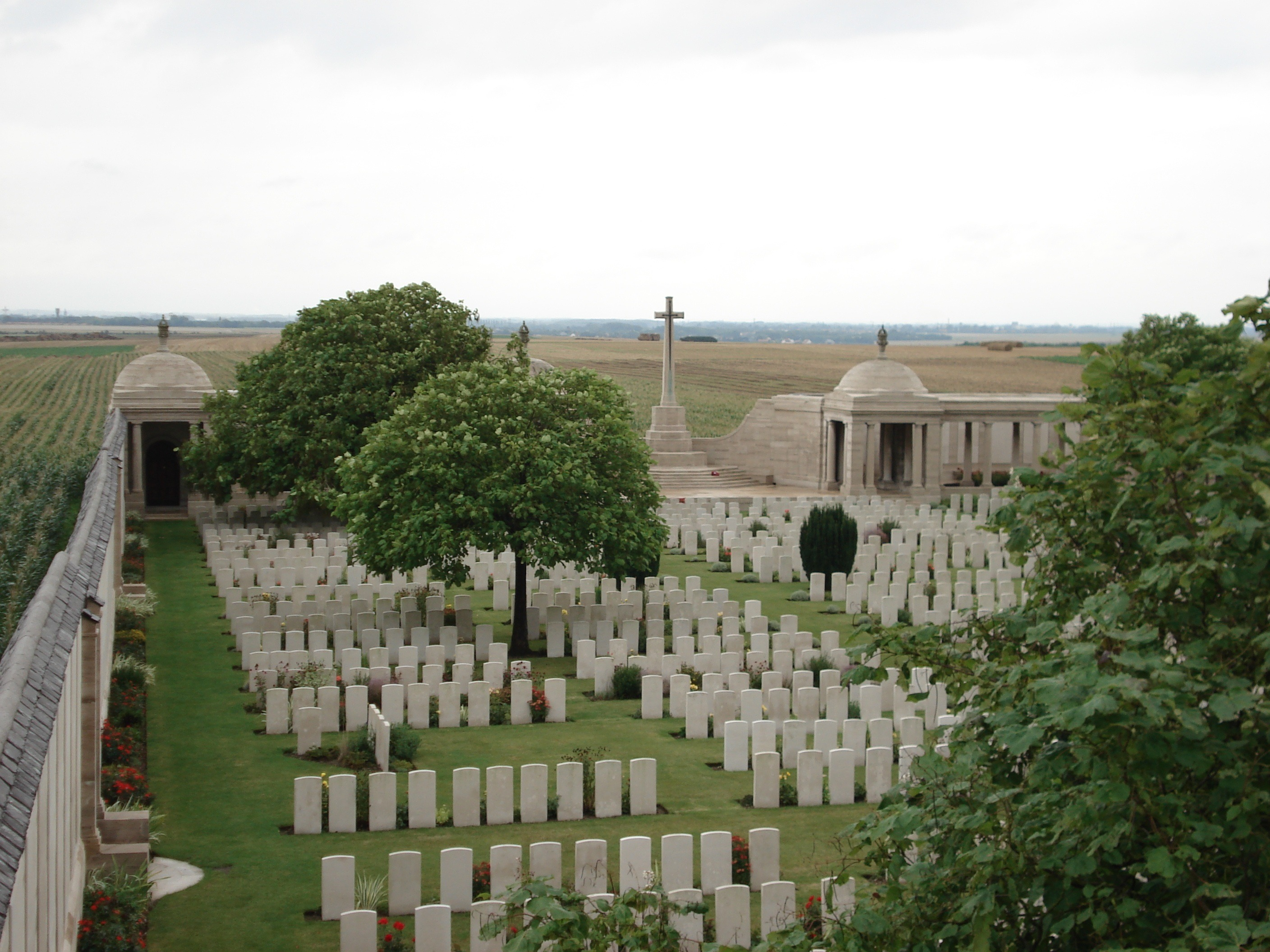
Dud Corner Cemetery

The Loos Memorial commemorates over 20,000 soldiers of Britain and the Commonwealth who fell in the battle and have no known grave. The community of Loos in British Columbia, changed its name from Crescent Island to commemorate the battle and several participants wrote of their experiences, Robert Graves described the battle and succeeding days in his war memoir Good-Bye to All That (1929), Patrick MacGill, who served as a stretcher-bearer in the London Irish and was wounded at Loos in October 1915, described the battle in his autobiographical novel The Great Push (1916) and James Hall related his experiences in the British Army at Loos in Kitchener's Mob (1916).

On the Centenary of the battle, the National Commemorial parade and service were held in Dundee. In attendance were the Prince of Wales, the Duchess of Cornwall, the First Minister, Nicola Sturgeon and the Presiding Officer of the Scottish Parliament, Tricia Marwick along with around 1,000 people, including serving soldiers and veterans.

== Victoria Cross ==
- Daniel Laidlaw, 7th (Service) Battalion, King's Own Scottish Borderers
- Frederick Henry Johnson, 73rd Field Company, Corps of Royal Engineers, 15th Division
- Harry Wells, 2nd Battalion Royal Sussex Regiment
- Anketell Moutray Read, 1st Battalion, Northamptonshire Regiment (posthumous)
- Henry Edward Kenny, 1st Battalion, Loyal North Lancashire Regiment
- George Stanley Peachment, 2nd Battalion, King's Royal Rifle Corps
- Arthur Vickers, 2nd Battalion, Royal Warwickshire Regiment
- George Maling, Royal Army Medical Corps
- Kulbir Thapa, 2nd Battalion, 3rd Queen Alexandra's Own Gurkha Rifles
- Rupert Price Hallowes, 4th Battalion, Middlesex Regiment
- Angus Douglas-Hamilton, 6th (Service) Battalion, Queen's Own Cameron Highlanders
- Arthur Frederick Saunders, 9th (Service) Battalion, Suffolk Regiment
- Robert Dunsire, 13th (Service) Battalion, Royal Scots
- James Dalgleish Pollock, 5th (Service) Battalion, Queen's Own Cameron Highlanders
- Alexander Buller Turner, 3rd Battalion, Royal Berkshire Regiment (posthumous)
- Alfred Alexander Burt, 1/1st Battalion, Hertfordshire Regiment
- Arthur Fleming-Sandes, 2nd Battalion, East Surrey Regiment
- Samuel Harvey, 1st Battalion, York and Lancaster Regiment
- Oliver Brooks, 3rd Battalion, Coldstream Guards
- James Lennox Dawson, 187th Company, Corps of Royal Engineers
- Geoffrey Vickers, Sherwood Foresters (Nottinghamshire and Derbyshire Regiment)

== See also ==
- John Kipling - killed in action during Battle of Loos, September 1915
- Charles Sorley - killed in action during Battle of Loos, October 1915

== Bibliography ==
- Boyle, Andrew (1962). Trenchard Man of Vision. London: Collins. OCLC 752992766.
- Buchan, John (1915). The Russian Stand, and the Allied Offensive in the West. Nelson´s History of the War. Vol. X. London: Thomas Nelson and Sons. OCLC 729766651. This article incorporates text from this source, which is in the public domain.
- Cherry, Niall (2008). Most Unfavourable Ground: The Battle of Loos, 1915. Helion & Company. ISBN 978-1-906-03321-7.
- Corrigan, Gordon (2006). Loos 1915: The Unwanted Battle. Stroud: Spellmount. ISBN 1-86227-239-5.
- Edmonds, J. E. (1928). Military Operations France and Belgium, 1915: Battles of Aubers Ridge, Festubert, and Loos. History of the Great War Based on Official Documents By Direction of the Historical Section of the Committee of Imperial Defence. Vol. II (1st ed.). London: Macmillan. OCLC 58962526.
- Graves, Robert (1980) [1957]. Goodbye to All That (Penguin ed.). London: Cassell. ISBN 0-14-00-1443-8.
- Hall, J. N. (1916). Kitchener's Mob: The Adventures of an American in the British Army (1st ed.). Boston: Houghton Mifflin. OCLC 1194374.
- Herwig, Holger (2014). The First World War. London: Bloomsbury Academic. ISBN 978-1-4725-1124-9.
- Hochschild, Adam (2011). To End All Wars. Boston: Houghton Mifflin Harcourt. ISBN 978-0-618-75828-9.
- Holmes, Richard (2005) [1981]. The Little Field Marshal. A Life of Sir John French (repr. Cassell Military Paperbacks ed.). London: Jonathan Cape. ISBN 978-0-304-36702-3.
- Humphries, M. O.; Maker, J. (2010). Germany's Western Front: Translations from the German Official History of the Great War. Vol. II (1st ed.). Waterloo Ont.: Wilfrid Laurier University Press. ISBN 978-1-55458-259-4.
- Jones, H. A. (2002) [1928]. The War in the Air, Being the Story of the Part played in the Great War by the Royal Air Force. History of the Great War Based on Official Documents By Direction of the Historical Section of the Committee of Imperial Defence. Vol. II (Imperial War Museum and Naval & Military Press ed.). London: Clarendon Press. ISBN 1-84342-413-4 – via Archive Foundation.
- Lloyd, Nick (2006). Loos 1915. Stroud: Tempus. ISBN 978-0-75-243937-2.
- Marshall-Cornwall, James (1973). Haig as Military Commander. London: Batsford. OCLC 1391568619.
- MacGill, P. (1916). The Great Push: An Episode of the Great War. New York: G. H. Doran. OCLC 655576627.
- Meyer, G. J. (2006). A World Undone. New York: Delta Trade Paperbacks. ISBN 978-0-553-38240-2.
- Richter, Donald (2014). Chemical Soldiers: British Gas Warfare in World War One. Barnsley: Pen & Sword Military. ISBN 978-1-78-346173-8.
- Sheldon, J. (2012). The German Army on the Western Front, 1915. Barnsley: Pen and Sword. ISBN 978-1-84884-466-7.
- Warner, P. (2000) [1976]. The Battle of Loos (Wordsworth ed.). London: William Kimber. ISBN 1-84022-229-8.
- Winter, Denis (2001). Haig's Command: A Reassessment. London: Penguin. ISBN 978-0-14-139093-2.

== Journals ==
- "Second Supplement to the London Gazette". London Gazette (29447). HMSO: 945. 22 January 1916. Archived from the original on 28 January 2018.

== Websites ==
- "Loos Memorial". Commonwealth War Graves Commission. OCLC 813744927.
- Twickenham Museum (2021). "Rifleman Frank Edwards". Twickenham Museum. Archived from the original on 9 May 2016.
