= Maling =

Maling may refer to:

== Buildings ==
- Maling station, a station in the Shenzhen Metro system
- Maling Temple, a temple in Houlong Township, Taiwan
- West Maling, a heritage-listed building in New South Wales, Australia
- Maling River Shankun Expressway Bridge, a bridge in Guizhou Province, China

== Geography ==
- Maling, Nepal, a village in Lamjung District, Nepal
- Maling Peak, a mountain in Coronation Island, Antarctica
- Maling River, a river in Guanxi Province, China

== Film and literature ==
- "Alas, Poor Maling", 1940 short story by Graham Greene
- Maling Kutang, 2009 Indonesian comedy film
- Mayavi Maling, 2018 Hindi television series

== Other ==
- Maling pottery, pottery in northeast England
- Maling Road, Melbourne, a shopping district in Canterbury, Australia
- Battle of Maling, a battle in 342 BC during the Warring States period

== See also ==
- Maling (surname)
