= Hohenzollern Redoubt =

German strongpoint on the Western Front during the First World War

- Part of First World War
- France; Near Auchy-les-Mines, France
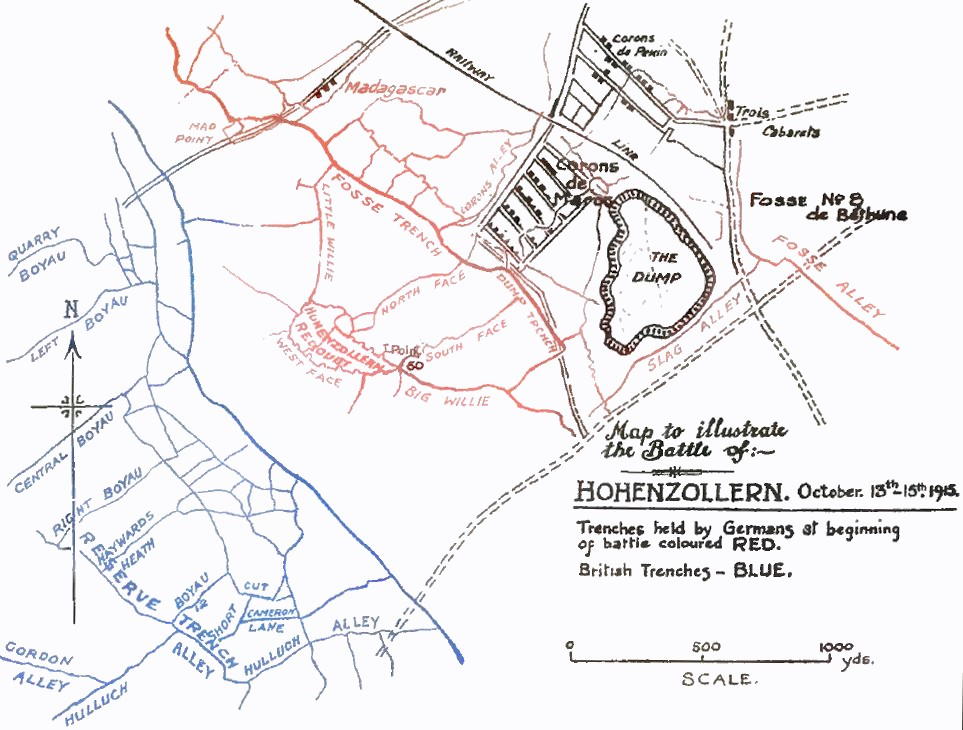
- Map of the Hohenzollern Redoubt, October 1915

Site information
- Controlled by: German 6th Army

Location
- Auchy-les-Mines near Loos-en-Gohelle, Nord-Pas-de-Calais region of France
- Location within France
- Coordinates: 50°29′54.29″N 02°46′29.71″E

Site history
- Built by: Westheer
- In use: 1915–1918
- Battles/wars: Loos, 1915

The Hohenzollern Redoubt (Hohenzollernwerk) was a strongpoint of the German 6th Army on the Western Front during the First World War, at Auchy-les-Mines near Loos-en-Gohelle in the Nord-Pas-de-Calais region of France. Named after the House of Hohenzollern, the redoubt was fought for by German and British forces. Engagements took place from the Battle of Loos (25 September – 14 October 1915) to the beginning of the Battle of the Somme on 1 July 1916, including the action of the Hohenzollern Redoubt in 1915 and the British Attack at the Hohenzollern Redoubt from 2 to 18 March 1916.

== Background ==
In the summer of 1915 the German armies continued the strengthening of front trenches, communication trenches and strong-points ordered by Chief of the General Staff General Erich von Falkenhayn, who on 25 January had also ordered the building of more defensive lines behind the front trench. Crown Prince Rupprecht the Sixth Army commander and some Western Front generals had objected to this policy, as an invitation to German troops to retreat rather than fight. After the experience of the Battle of Festubert, where Allied artillery had proved capable of destroying a great width of front trench, opposition had been abandoned and the work carried on as quickly as possible. In early May, Falkenhayn had also ordered that a second defensive position be built 2,000–3,000 yd (1,800–2,700 m) behind the whole of the Western Front, to force an attacker to pause to move artillery forward into range.

=== German preparations in 1915 ===
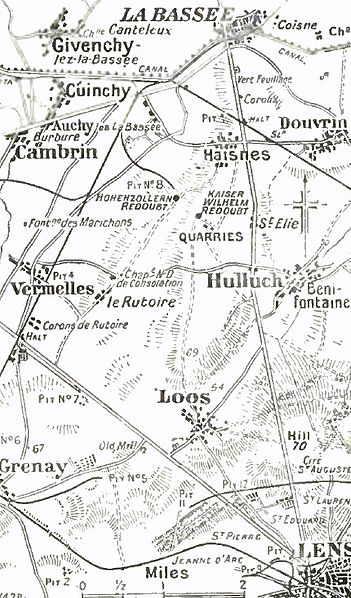
Map of the Hohenzollern Redoubt area, September 1915

A number of pit-heads known as Fosses and auxiliary shafts called Puits had been built around Loos-en-Gohelle in the Nord-Pas-de-Calais region of France, when the area was developed by the mining industry; Fosse 8 de Béthune was close to the north end of a spoil-heap (Crassier) known as "The Dump". The Crassiers had been tunnelled or hollowed out by both sides, to provide observation-posts and machine-gun nests. The Dump was 20 ft (6.1 m) high, with an excellent view in all directions. New fortifications were built as quickly as possible, after the Franco-British offensives in May and June 1915. At Dump and Fosse trenches, on a slight rise 400 yd (370 m) in front of the original front line, a new defensive work wired for all-round defence was built and named the Hohenzollernwerk. The face of the redoubt was 300 yd (270 m) long and curved, with extensions to join with "Big Willie" Trench to the south and "Little Willie" Trench to the north. British planners judged the Hohenzollern Redoubt to be the strongest defensive-work on the whole of the front. In the area of Fosse 8, more fortifications were built in July by the German 117th Division, after it had fought at Vimy Ridge in May and June; once a period of reorganisation at Roubaix was over, the division returned to the line on 9 July.

=== British attacks 13–19 October 1915 ===
Starting during the Battle of Loos (25 September – 15 October 1915), British units carried out a concentrated attack on the Hohenzollern Redoubt which lasted from 13 – 19 October 1915. The British 9th (Scottish) Division captured the redoubt and then lost it to a German counter-attack. The final British assault on 13 October failed and resulted in 3,643 casualties, mostly in the first few minutes. The official history of the war suggested that "The fighting on the 13th–14th October had not improved the general situation in any way and had brought nothing but useless slaughter of infantry". General Sir Douglas Haig thought it might be possible to launch another attack on 7 November 1915 but heavy rain and accurate German shelling during the second half of October finally persuaded him to abandon the attempt.

=== British attacks 2–18 March 1916 ===
Over the winter months, the British 170th Tunnelling Company dug several galleries under the German lines at the Hohenzollern Redoubt, which had changed hands several times since September 1915. In February 1916, mining was being conducted at the Quarries and near Fosse 8, where explosions were frequent and were followed by infantry attacks to occupy the near lip and by sapping forward. In March 1916, the west side was held by the British and the east side was still occupied by the Germans, with the front near a new German trench known as the Chord. The Germans had an unobstructed view of the British positions from a slag heap named Fosse 8 and during previous fighting no man's land had become a crater field. On 2 March, four mines (the largest yet sprung by the British) were detonated, followed by a British advance towards the German lines. The 12th Division intended to capture the crater field, gain observation from crater lips over the German defences back to Fosse 8and end the threat of German mine attacks. German counter-attacks drove the British back by 6 March. On 18 March, the Germans surprised the British with five mines. The 37th Brigade was eventually relieved by the 35th Brigade, and by the time that the crater fighting died down, both sides held the near sides of the craters.

=== Subsequent operations in 1916 ===
Following the British attacks of 2–18 March, the German units at the Hohenzollern Redoubt were considerably reinforced. The new German garrison of the redoubt remained doubled for several days and a high level of alert maintained until the end of the month, when the possibility of another British attack was considered to have ended. On 19 March 1916, the British exploded another mine at the redoubt and the Germans sprung two mines in the Quarries on 24 March. British mines were blown on 26 and 27 March, 5, 13, 20, 21 and 22 April 1916; German mines were exploded on 31 March, on 2, 8, 11, 12 and 23 April 1916. Each explosion was followed by infantry attacks and consolidation of the mine lips, which were costly to both sides and turned more areas of no man's land into crater fields. The British 12th Division was eventually relieved on 26 April 1916 and missed the German gas attacks at Hulluch which began the next day, from an area close to the Hohenzollern Redoubt. Engagements continued until the summer, when the British and Commonwealth forces moved their focus south, in preparation of the Battle of the Somme (1 July – 18 November 1916).

== Gallery ==
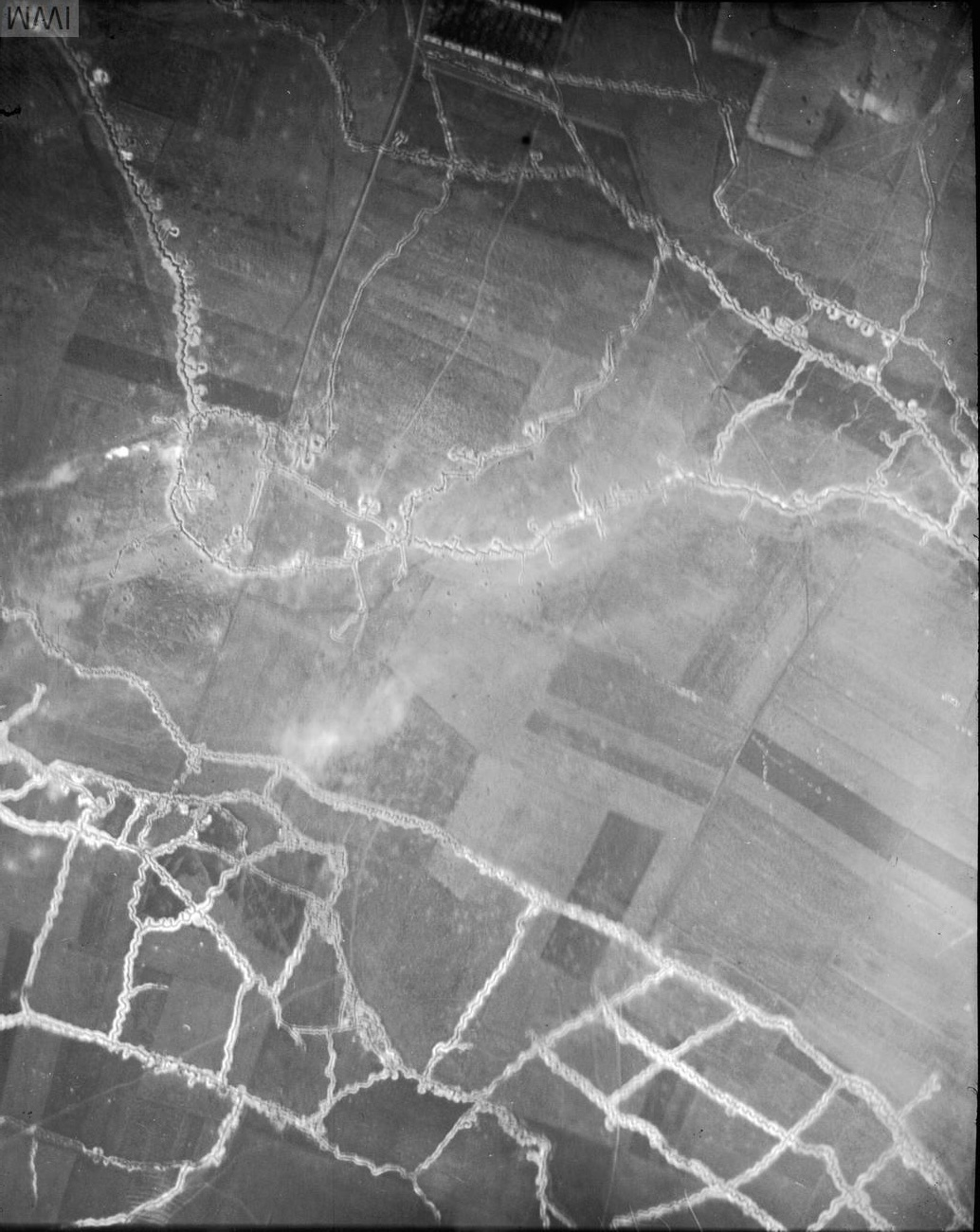
Aerial photograph of the Hohenzollern redoubt, near Auchy-les-Mines, 21 September 1915

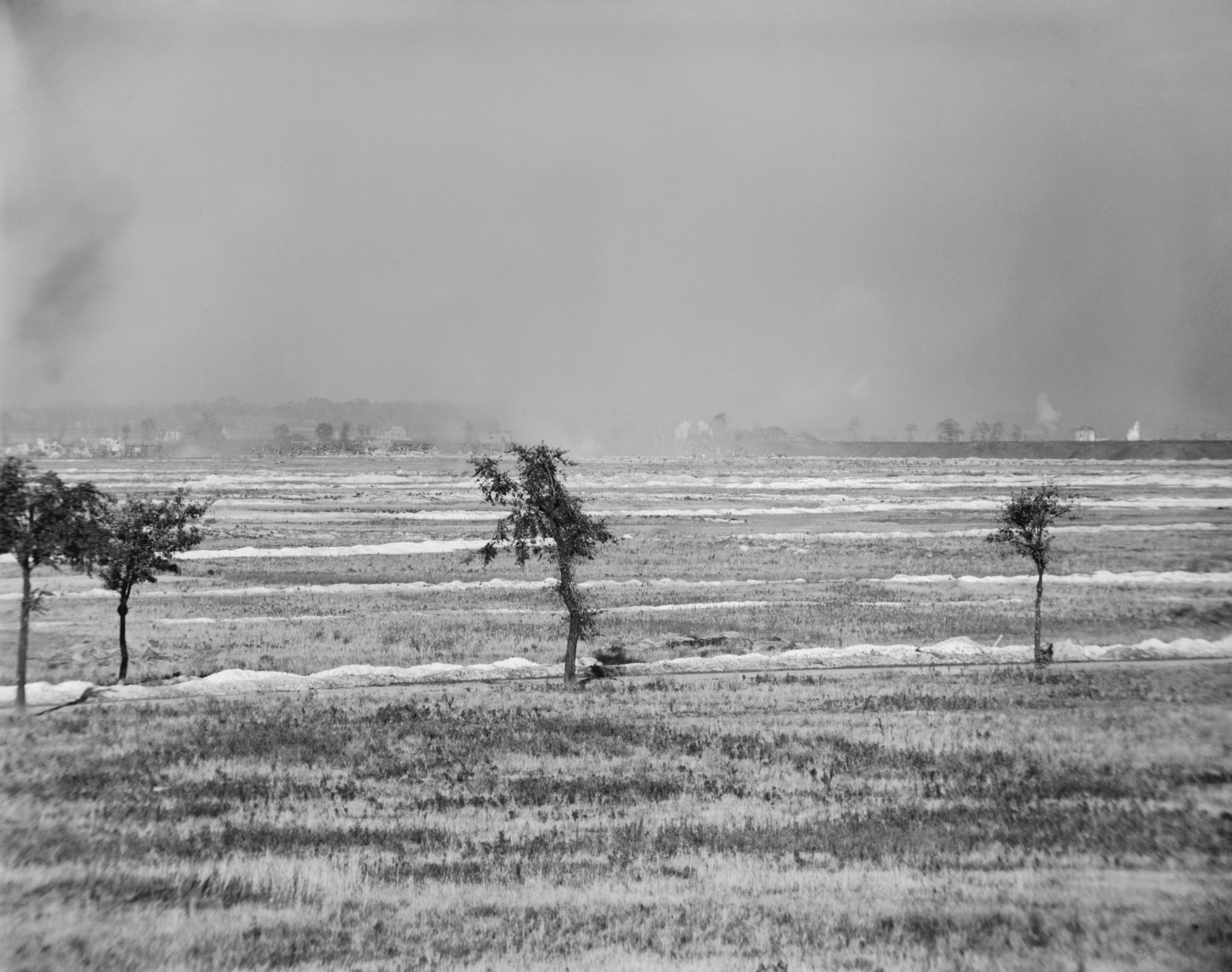
The British 46th (North Midland) Division attacking the Hohenzollern Redoubt during the Battle of Loos. A cloud of smoke and gas appears in the centre and left. 13 October 1915

Trench map showing British lines, carried by Captain Charles Geoffrey Vickers

Second trench map showing British lines, carried by Vickers.

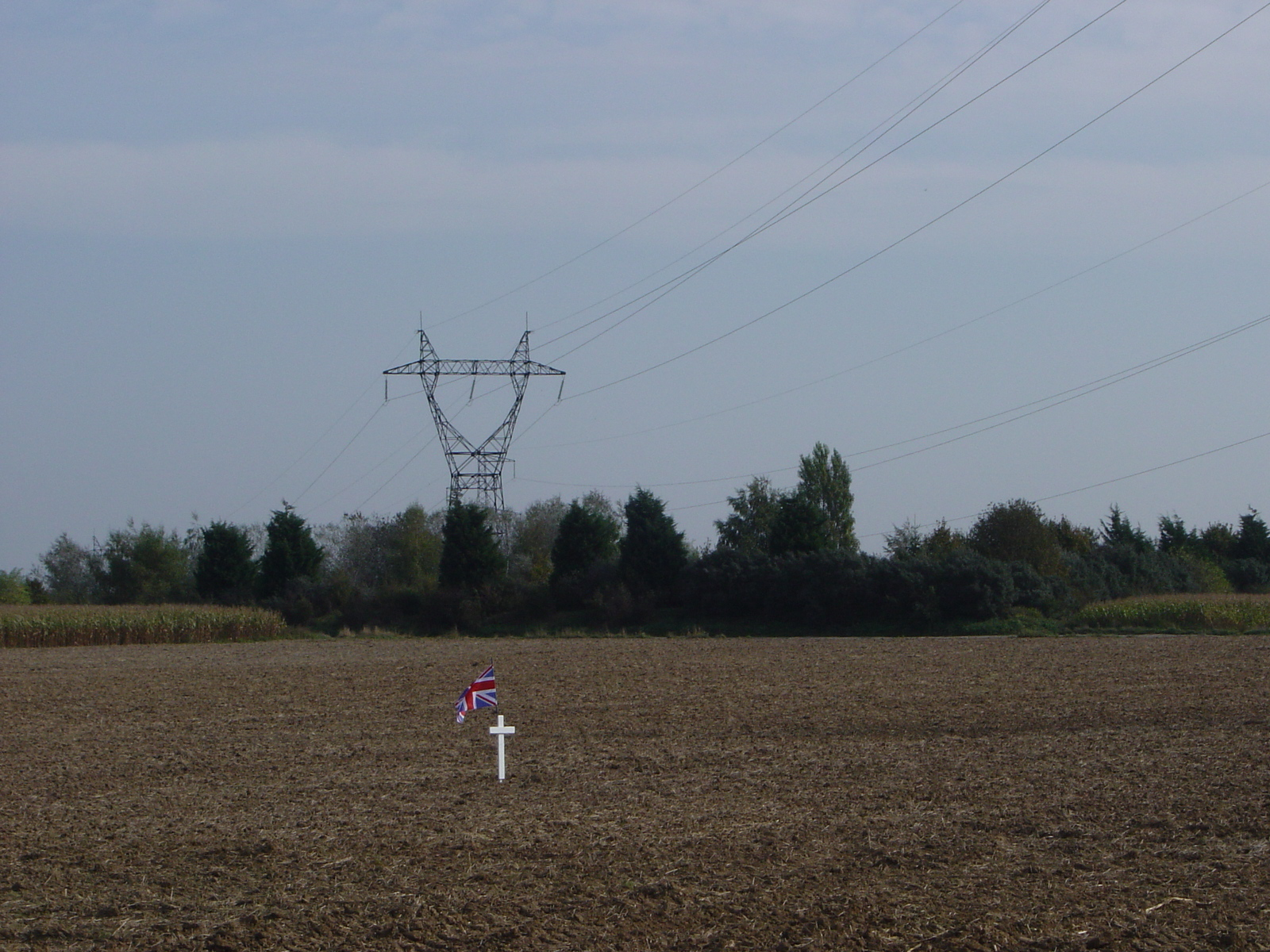
Union Flag is sited in the centre of no man's land; the pylon stands on the site of the redoubt.

== Victoria Cross ==
The following soldiers received the Victoria Cross in connection with operations at the Hohenzollern Redoubt:

- 13 October 1915: Corporal James Lennox Dawson (187th Company, Corps of Royal Engineers).
- 14 October 1915: Captain Geoffrey Vickers (The Sherwood Foresters).
- 27 September 1915: Corporal James Dalgleish Pollock (Queen's Own Cameron Highlanders).
- 29 September 1915: 2nd Lt Arthur James Terence Fleming-Sandes The East Surrey Regiment.

== Commemoration ==
Hohenzollern Redoubt Memorial
- United Kingdom
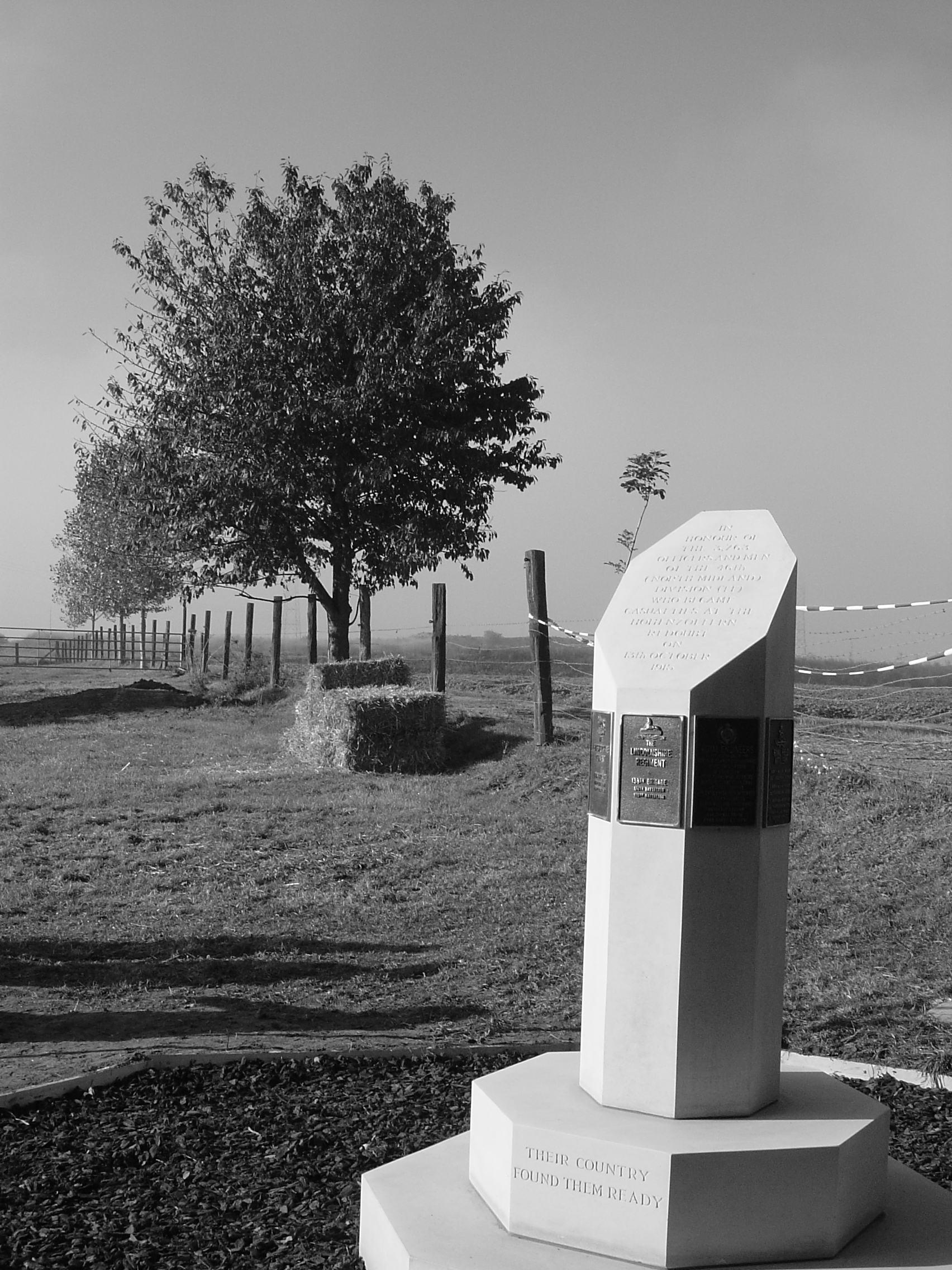
- Hohenzollern Redoubt Memorial
- For The officers and men of the 46th (North Midland) Division who became casualties at the Hohenzollern Redoubt on 13 October 1915.
- Designed by: Michael Credland
- Their Country Found Them Ready

The missing are commemorated on the Loos Memorial. On 13 October 2006, a memorial was unveiled, to commemorate the officers and men of the 46th (North Midland) Division who became casualties, on the 91st anniversary of the final assault. The memorial was designed by Michael Credland in the form of an octagonal broken column of Portland stone, 46 in (1.2 m) high, with two tiers of steps forming the base. The broken column signifies the loss of the head of the family and the loss of an army column. The angle of cut at the top of the column is 46° and the pitch of the steps is the same angle. An inscription "Their Country Found Them Ready", is carved on the top step of the Memorial and was chosen by Martin Middlebrook, from the song Keep the Home Fires Burning, composed by Ivor Novello in 1915.

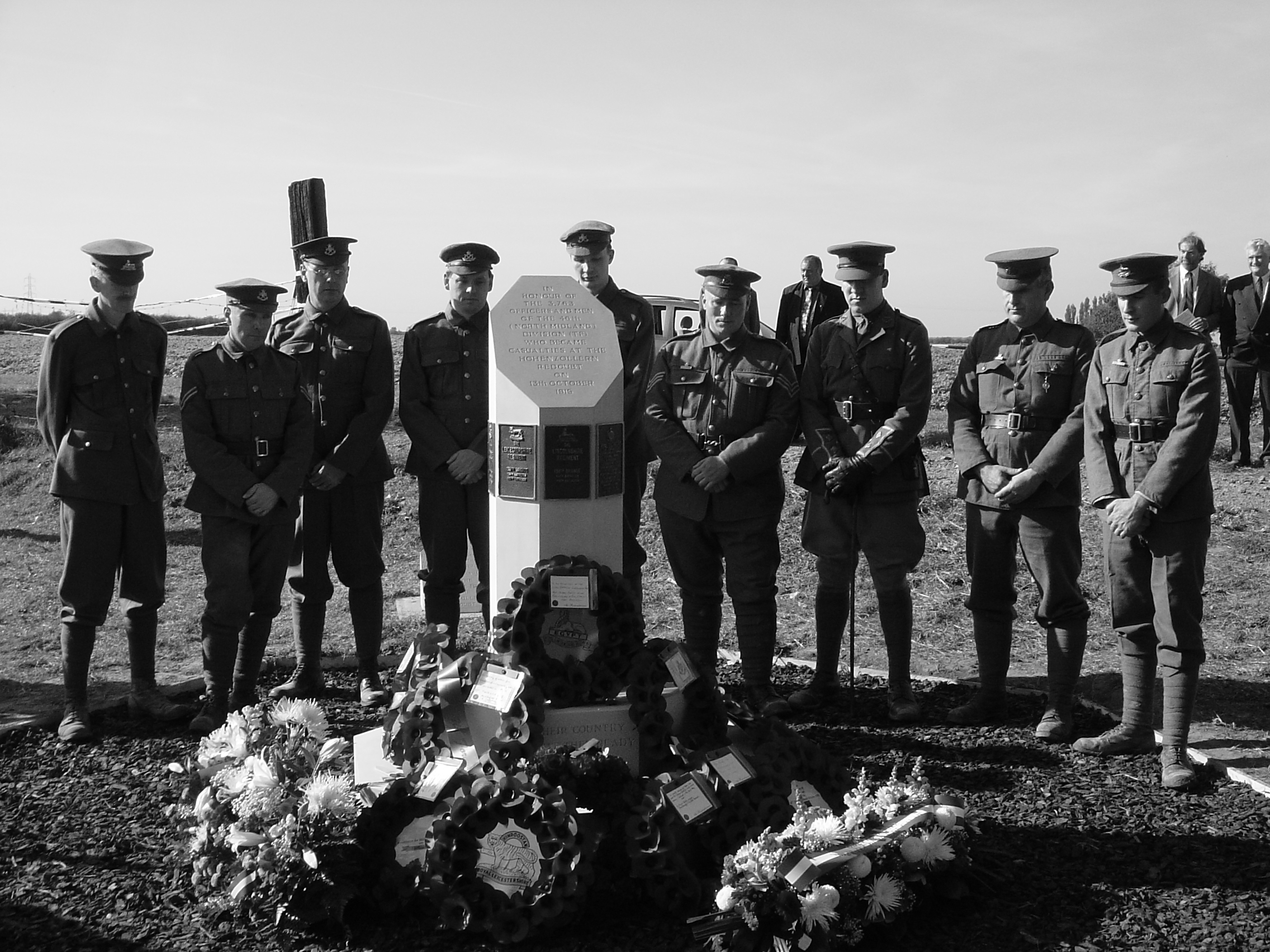
Unveiling ceremony

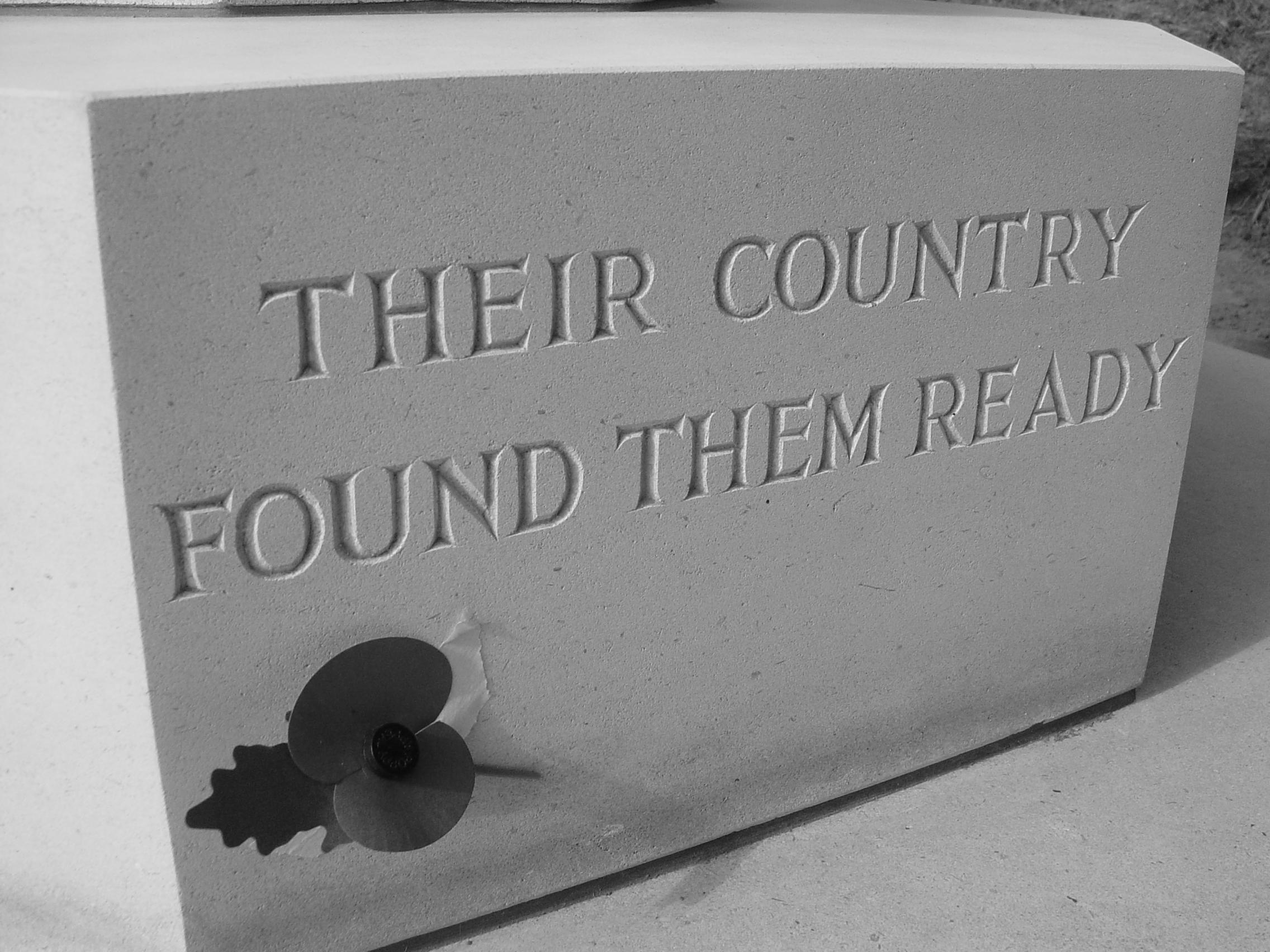
