= Harriet Florence Maling =

American pharmacologist

Harriet Florence Maling (née Mylander, October 2, 1918 – March 1987) was an American pharmacologist. She graduated Phi Beta Kappa from Goucher College in 1940. She went to Harvard Medical School to continue her studies, earning a PhD in 1944.

Her focus of study involved the physiology of the heart, the effects of various drugs upon the heart and on the autonomic and sympathetic nervous systems, experimenting with artificially created myocardial infarction.

Her daughter Joan Maling is a linguist and past president of the Linguistic Society of America.
