= John Allan Maling =

John Allan Maling MC (13 February 1920 – 16 December 2012) was a British Army officer during the Second World War who won the Military Cross for his action in Algeria. Ordered to defend a strategically important road junction, Maling and his platoon destroyed a number of German tanks and killed 40-50 of the enemy at a cost of only one casualty on their side. After the war he trained as a doctor at St Thomas's Hospital, and then worked as a general practitioner in Tunbridge Wells.

He was the son of George Allan Maling, VC.
