= Joan Maling =

American linguist (born 1946)

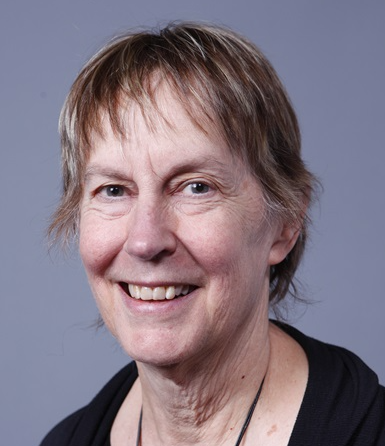
- Born: November 15, 1946; Baltimore, Maryland, U.S.
- Citizenship: United States
- Education: Goucher College
- Alma mater: Massachusetts Institute of Technology
- Known for: Past president of the Linguistic Society of America
- Partner: Geoffrey K. Pullum
- Scientific career
- Fields: Linguistics
- Institutions: National Science Foundation; Brandeis University
- Thesis: The Theory of Classical Arabic Metrics (1973)
- Doctoral advisor: Morris Halle

Joan Maling (born November 15, 1946) is an American linguist and a former program director at the National Science Foundation. Her primary research expertise is in the syntax of Icelandic. Her mother was Harriet Florence Maling.

Maling earned a BA from Goucher College and a PhD in linguistics from the Massachusetts Institute of Technology (1973). She taught at Brandeis University from 1972 until she joined the National Science Foundation in 2003. She is professor emerita at Brandeis University.

Maling was a founding co-editor (1983–1986) and then editor-in-chief (1987–2003) of the linguistics journal Natural Language and Linguistic Theory. She is a past president of the Linguistic Society of America (2014).

Maling retired from the National Science Foundation in 2021.
