= John Darwin Maling =

British Indian Army officer (1915–2009)

John Maling
- Born: 2 February 1915; Timaru, New Zealand
- Died: 16 March 2009 (aged 94); New Zealand
- Military career
- Allegiance: United Kingdom
- Branch: (British Raj) British Indian Army
- Service years: 1935–1959
- Rank: Lieutenant Colonel
- Commands: 1st Battalion, Sikh Light Infantry; 16th Light Anti-Aircraft Regiment
- Conflicts: Third Waziristan Campaign; Second World War
- Awards: Distinguished Service Order, Military Cross, Mentioned in Dispatches

Lieutenant Colonel John Darwin Maling DSO MC (2 February 1915 – 16 March 2009) was a New Zealand-born British Indian Army officer during the Second World War.

== Early life ==
Maling was born in Timaru, New Zealand and educated at Christ's College, Christchurch. He then attended the Royal Military College, Sandhurst and was commissioned in 1935.

== Military career ==
He served for a year with 1st Battalion, Leicestershire Regiment in India, before transferring to the 1st Battalion, (King George V's Own) 11th Sikh Regiment of the Indian Army. He served in the Waziristan campaign (1936–39) and was awarded the Military Cross in 1937. In 1941 he became adjutant of a new regiment, the Sikh Light Infantry, and saw active service with the unit during the Burma Campaign. He became acting Commanding Officer of the Sikh Light Infantry in April 1945, but was wounded shortly thereafter. He retook command of the regiment in June 1945, holding the position in 1947. On 20 September 1945 he was awarded the Distinguished Service Order for his actions in Burma.

In 1948, he transferred to the Royal Artillery. Maling was a brigade major with the 53rd (Welsh) Infantry Division, before serving with the 33rd Airborne Light Regiment in Egypt. In 1956 he became Commanding Officer of the 16th Light Anti-Aircraft Regiment, garrisoned in Cyprus. He retired from the army in 1959 and returned to New Zealand.

== Later career ==
He worked for the New Zealand Security Intelligence Service from 1959 to 1981.
