= George Allan Maling =

English military doctor (1888–1929); Victoria Cross recipient

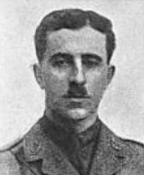
- Born: 6 October 1888; Bishopwearmouth, County Durham, England
- Died: 9 July 1929 (aged 40); Lee, Kent, England
- Burial place: Chislehurst Cemetery, Kent
- Military career
- Allegiance: United Kingdom
- Branch: British Army
- Rank: Captain
- Units: Royal Army Medical Corps
- Conflicts: World War I
- Awards: Victoria Cross

George Allan Maling VC (6 October 1888 – 9 July 1929) was an English medical doctor and recipient of the Victoria Cross, the highest and most prestigious award for gallantry in the face of the enemy that can be awarded to British and Commonwealth forces.

== Early life ==
Descended from the Maling pottery family, Maling was born at Carlton House in Bishopwearmouth, County Durham (now part of Sunderland), the youngest of nine children of Edwin Allan Maling (1838–1920), a general practitioner, and his wife Maria Jane, née Hartley (1847–1932). His paternal grandmother was a first cousin of Sir Henry Havelock. His mother's family originated from Scotland and had established a glassmaking business in Sunderland in the 1830s. Maling was educated at Uppingham School and graduated with honours in natural sciences from Exeter College, Oxford. He continued his studies at St Thomas' Hospital, qualifying MB BCh in 1914, then MRCS and LRCP in 1915.

After the initial outbreak of the First World War, Maling gained a temporary commission in the Royal Army Medical Corps as a 26-year-old Lieutenant in the Royal Army Medical Corps on 18 January 1915. After five months he joined the 12th Battalion, The Rifle Brigade (Prince Consort's Own) as their medical officer. The following deed took place for which he was awarded the VC:

On 25 September 1915 near Fauquissart, France Lieutenant Maling worked for over 24 hours with untiring energy, collecting and treating in the open, under heavy shell fire, more than 300 men. During the morning of the 25th he was temporarily stunned by the bursting of a large high-explosive shell which wounded his only assistant and killed several of his patients. A second shell covered him and his instruments with debris, but he continued his gallant work single-handed.

Maling was mentioned in despatches and promoted to Captain in 1916. He then returned to the UK and served in the Military Hospital in Grantham. He later joined the 34th Field Ambulance of the 11th (Northern) Division and served again in France for two years.

On 5 May 1917, Maling married Daisy Mabel Wolmer (1891–1973), originally from Winnipeg, at Sutton, Surrey and they had four children:

- John Allan MC (1920–2012), served in the Second World War and also became a doctor. Married Daphne Judith ("Judy") Haines in 1952 and had issue.
- Phyllis Mary (1922–2008), married Richard David Mortlock (1923–1976) and had issue.
- Edwin Lambton (1922–1941), died suddenly, aged 19, at the Royal Hospital School after recently enrolling in the Royal Navy.
- Barbara (1926–1949)

After the war, George was appointed resident Medical Officer at the Victoria Hospital for Children at Chelsea. He then set up a practice in Lee and was also appointed a surgeon to outpatients at St. John's Hospital, Lewisham.

== Death and legacy ==
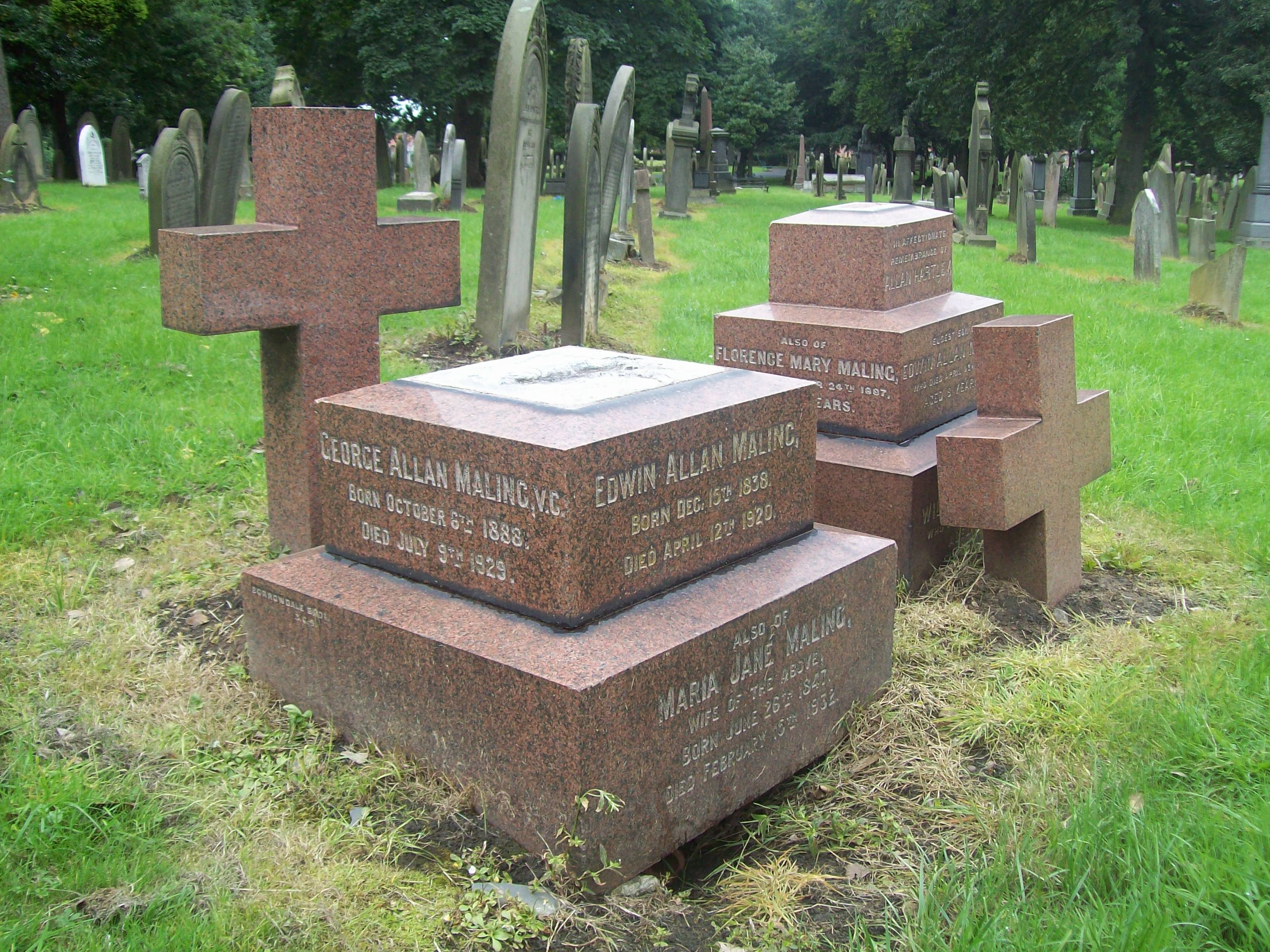
Maling is commemorated on his parents' grave in Bishopwearmouth Cemetery.

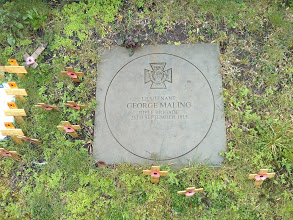
George Mailing plaque at Sunderland War Memorial

Maling died on 9 July 1929, aged 40, after suffering from pleurisy and was buried in Chislehurst Cemetery. His Victoria Cross was on loan to the Royal Army Medical Corps until it was sold to Lord Ashcroft, and is now part of his collection. On 25 September 2015, a commemorative paving stone was placed at the base of Sunderland War Memorial, to mark 100 years since Maling was awarded the Victoria Cross.

== Bibliography ==
- Batchelor, Peter; Matson, Christopher (2011). The Western Front 1915. VCs of the First World War. The History Press. ISBN 978-0-7524-6057-4.
- Whitworth, Alan (2015). VCs of the North: Cumbria, Durham & Northumberland. Pen and Sword Books. ISBN 978-1473848221.
