= James Lennox Dawson =

Scottish Victoria Cross recipient (1891-1967)

- Born: 25 December 1891; Tillicoultry, Clackmannanshire
- Died: 15 February 1967 (aged 75); Eastbourne, East Sussex
- Burial place: Eastbourne Crematorium
- Relatives: James Dalgleish Pollock VC (second cousin)
- Military career
- Allegiance: United Kingdom
- Branch: British Army
- Rank: Colonel
- Units: The Cameronians; Royal Engineers; Army Education Corps; Indian Army Ordnance Corps
- Conflicts: World War I
- Awards: Victoria Cross

Colonel James Lennox Dawson VC (25 December 1891 – 15 February 1967) was a Scottish recipient of the Victoria Cross, the highest and most prestigious award for gallantry in the face of the enemy that can be awarded to British and Commonwealth forces.

Before joining the army, Dawson was a teacher in Hills Trust Public School in Govan. He enlisted in White Street, Partick.

Dawson enlisted into the 5th Cameronians in November 1914, but transferred to the Royal Engineers in March 1915.

== VC action ==
He was 23 years old, and a corporal in the 187th Company, Corps of Royal Engineers, British Army during the First World War when the following deed took place at the Battle of Loos, for which he was awarded the VC.

On 13 October 1915 at Hohenzollern Redoubt, France, during a gas attack, when the trenches were full of men, Corporal Dawson exposed himself fearlessly to the enemy's fire to give directions to his sappers and to clear the infantry out of sections of the trench which were full of gas. Finding three leaking cylinders, he rolled them well away from the trench, again under heavy fire, and then fired rifle bullets into them to let the gas escape. His gallantry undoubtedly saved many men from being gassed.

King George V presented Dawson with his medal on Wednesday December 15, 1915. When pinning on the medal, the King commended Dawson on his coolness and pluck.

== Later career ==
He was commissioned into the Royal Engineers in December 1916 and demobilised as a Major in 1919. After graduating from Glasgow University, with a degree in pure science, he was commissioned in the Army Education Corps in 1920, but transferred to the Indian Army Ordnance Corps in 1931.

He later achieved the rank of colonel. By co-incidence his second cousin (their fathers were first cousins) James Dalgleish Pollock was also awarded the Victoria Cross in the same battle at the Hohenzollern Redoubt. He too saved his colleagues from certain death by climbing out of the trench and bombing German infiltrators out of the British lines. Both boys were born in the small Scottish town of Tillicoultry, though James Dawson's family moved to the county town of Alloa when he was eight. Both were considered local heroes in 1915 and were feted in Alloa and Tillicoultry in separate civic receptions, allied to recruitment drives.

His VC is held by the University of Glasgow where he earned his BSc and is displayed at the Hunterian Museum.

== Bibliography ==
- Monuments to Courage (David Harvey, 1999)
- The Register of the Victoria Cross (This England, 1997)
- The Sapper VCs (Gerald Napier, 1998)
- Scotland's Forgotten Valour (Graham Ross, 1995)
- Batchelor, Peter F.; Matson, Christopher (2012). VCs of the First World War: Western Front 1915. The History Press. ISBN 978-0752460574.
