= James Dalgleish Pollock =

Scottish Victoria Cross recipient (1890-1958)

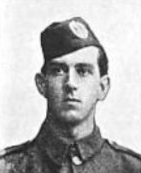
- Born: 3 June 1890; Tillicoultry, Clackmannanshire, Scotland
- Died: 10 May 1958 (aged 67); Ballochmyle, Ayrshire, Scotland
- Burial place: Ayr Cemetery
- Military career
- Allegiance: United Kingdom
- Branch: British Army
- Service years: 1914–1919
- Rank: Captain
- Unit: The Queen's Own Cameron Highlanders
- Conflicts: World War I
- Awards: Victoria Cross
- Other work: Observer Lieutenant: Royal Observer Corps (1940–1946)

Captain James Dalgleish Pollock, VC (3 June 1890 – 10 May 1958) was a Scottish recipient of the Victoria Cross, the highest and most prestigious award for gallantry in the face of the enemy that can be awarded to British and Commonwealth forces.

== Details ==
Pollock was 25 years old, and a corporal in the 5th Battalion, The Queen's Own Cameron Highlanders during the First World War when the following deed took place at the Battle of Loos, for which he was awarded the VC.:

On 27 September 1915 near the Hohenzollern Redoubt, France, at about noon the enemy's bombers in superior numbers were successfully working up "Little Willie" Trench towards the Redoubt. Corporal Pollock, after obtaining permission, got out of the trench alone and walked along the top edge with complete disregard for danger, and compelled the enemy bombers to retire by bombing them from above. He was under heavy machine-gun fire the whole time, but contrived to hold up the progress of the Germans for an hour before he was at length wounded.

== Further information ==
He was commissioned into the Cameron Highlanders in 1916 and left the Army in 1919 with the rank of captain.

James Pollock gained the VC for his outstanding bravery in saving his comrades in the Big Willie trench when it was infiltrated by German bombers. Just over two weeks later his second cousin, James Lennox Dawson also won the VC in the same trenches at the same battle. His actions were remarkably similar. Dawson saved his colleagues in the trench by going over the top, under machine-gun fire, to roll away gas canisters that had been blown open by German shells. Both men were 25 years of age and born within six months of each other in the small Scottish town of Tillicoultry. Both were feted back in Scotland and given the equivalent of a civic reception, James Pollock in Tillicoultry and James Dawson in Alloa, barely a week apart in December 1915.

== Royal Observer Corps ==
Pollock volunteered for service the Royal Observer Corps during World War II. He is recorded as being an observer officer and full-time duty controller in No 33 Aberdeen (Ayr) Group. As far as is known, he was the only ROC officer in the history of the corps to hold the Victoria Cross. Along with other members of No 33 Group, James Pollock stood down on or before 12 May 1945.

To mark the end of the Second World War the Air Ministry arranged a huge rally at RAF North Weald in Essex from Saturday 23 June to Monday 25 June 1945. Almost 2,000 members of the ROC from all over the United Kingdom were invited to attend the rally. King George VI had already approved the design of an ensign for the newly formed Royal Observer Corps, the ensign was RAF blue with the Union Jack in one corner and also bearing the corps' crest. It was dedicated at a special service held at North Weald on Sunday 24 June 1945. That day the 2,000 observers carried out the first ever uniformed ROC march past to the accompaniment of the RAF Band with the under secretary of state for air, Lord Beatty, taking the salute. The parade then formed into a huge square and the Royal Observer Corps ensign was presented by Lord Beatty. The ensign was borne to the drumhead by Observer Lieutenant Pollock VC. In the parade Observer Lieutenant Pollock bore the ensign flanked by two senior NCOs at the head of the massed contingent of observers. A filmed record of the day's events is held in the National Archive at the Imperial War Museum, London.

== The medal ==
Victoria Cross medal

His Victoria Cross is displayed at the Regimental Museum of Queens Own Highlanders, (Fort George, Inverness-shire, Scotland).
