= Bully (disambiguation) =

A bully is someone responsible for bullying, using aggression to intimidate or dominate others.

Bully may also refer to:

== Animals ==
- American Bully, a breed of dog
- Bull Terrier or bully, a breed of dog
- Gobiomorphus or bully, an Australian and New Zealand genus of fish

== Film and television ==
=== Film ===
- The Bully, a 1918 film produced by Ebony Film Corporation
- The Bully (1932 film), a Flip the Frog cartoon
- Bullies (film), a 1986 Canadian film
- Bully (2001 film), an American film by Larry Clark
- Bully (2011 film), an American documentary about bullying
- Bully (2017 film), an American musical featurette

=== Television ===
- "Bully" (The Brak Show), a 2002 episode
- "Bully" (Law & Order: Special Victims Unit), a 2011 episode
- "Bully" (Moving On), a 2009 episode
- "Bully" (New Girl), a 2012 episode
- "Bully", an episode of the TV series Heartstopper
- "Bullies" (The Newsroom), a 2012 episode
- "The Bully" (Kate & Allie), a 1986 episode
- "The Bully" (SpongeBob SquarePants), a 2001 episode
- Bully, the mascot of the British game show Bullseye

== Music ==
- Bully (band), an American rock band
- "Bully" (song), by Shinedown, 2012
- Bully (album), a 2026 album by Kanye West or the title track
- Bully, a 2001 album by American pop band Sugarbomb
- Bully, a 2015 album by Australian extreme metal band High Tension
- "Bully", a song by Eminem from Straight from the Lab, 2003
- "Bully", a song by Gob from Foot in Mouth Disease, 2003
- "Bully", a song by Judie Tzuke from Secret Agent, 1998
- "Bully", a song by Lamb of God from Into Oblivion, 2026
- "Bully", a song by Three Days Grace from Life Starts Now, 2009
- "The Bully", a song by Sia from Colour the Small One, 2004
- "Bullies", a song by Baby Keem from Die for My Bitch, 2019

== People with the nickname ==
- Wally Bullington (1931–2018), American college football player and coach
- Big Bully Busick (1954–2018), American police officer turned professional wrestler
- Bully Dawson (fl. 17th century), English gambler
- Bully Gilstrap (fl. mid-20th century), American college athlete and coach
- Bully Hayes (1827/9–1877), American slaver and sea captain
- Michael Herbig (born 1968), German film director, actor and author
- Gray Maynard (born 1979), American mixed martial artist
- William T. Van de Graaff (1895–1977), American college football player and coach
- Robert Waterman (sea captain) (1808–1884), American merchant sea captain

== Places ==
- Bully, Loire, France
- Bully, Rhône, France
- Bully, Seine-Maritime, France
- Bully-les-Mines, France
- Bully Creek (Malheur River tributary), Oregon, US

== Sports ==
- Bully (mascot), mascot of the Mississippi State University Bulldogs athletics teams
- Columbus Bullies, a professional American football team 1938–1942
- Jacksonville Bullies, a professional indoor lacrosse team 2012

== Surname ==
- Alwin Bully (1948–2023), Dominican cultural administrator, playwright, designer of national flag

== Other uses ==
- Bully (video game), a 2006 action-adventure game
- The Bully: A Discussion and Activity Story, a 2003 children's book by Rita Y. Toews
- The Bully, a 2002 novel in The Bluford Series
- Bully beef, a type of salt-cured beef product
- Sideroxylon, or bully trees
- Volkswagen Type 2, a panel van nicknamed "Bully"

== See also ==
- Bulley (disambiguation)
