= George Legge (footballer) =

Scottish footballer

Personal information
- Date of birth: 12 July 1886
- Place of birth: Shettleston, Scotland
- Date of death: 25 September 1915 (aged 29)
- Place of death: Auchy-lez-La-Bassée, France
- Position: Forward

Senior career*
Years	Team	Apps	(Gls)
1910–1914	Queen's Park	2	(0)
- * Club domestic league appearances and goals

George Legge (12 July 1886 – 25 September 1915) was a Scottish amateur footballer who played in the Scottish League for Queen's Park as a forward.

== Personal life ==
As of 1911, Legge was working as a teacher at Skerry's College. Soon after the outbreak of the First World War in August 1914, Legge enlisted as a private in the Queen's Own Cameron Highlanders. He was killed in action on 29 September 1915, in an advance on Auchy-lez-La-Bassée during the early stages of the Battle of Loos. He is commemorated on the Loos Memorial.

== Career statistics ==
Appearances and goals by club, season and competition
Club	Season	League			Scottish Cup		Total	
Club	Season	Division	Apps	Goals	Apps	Goals	Apps	Goals
Queen's Park	1910–11	Scottish First Division	2	0	0	0	2	0
Career total			2	0	0	0	2	0
