= Compagnie des mines de Béthune =

French coal mining company

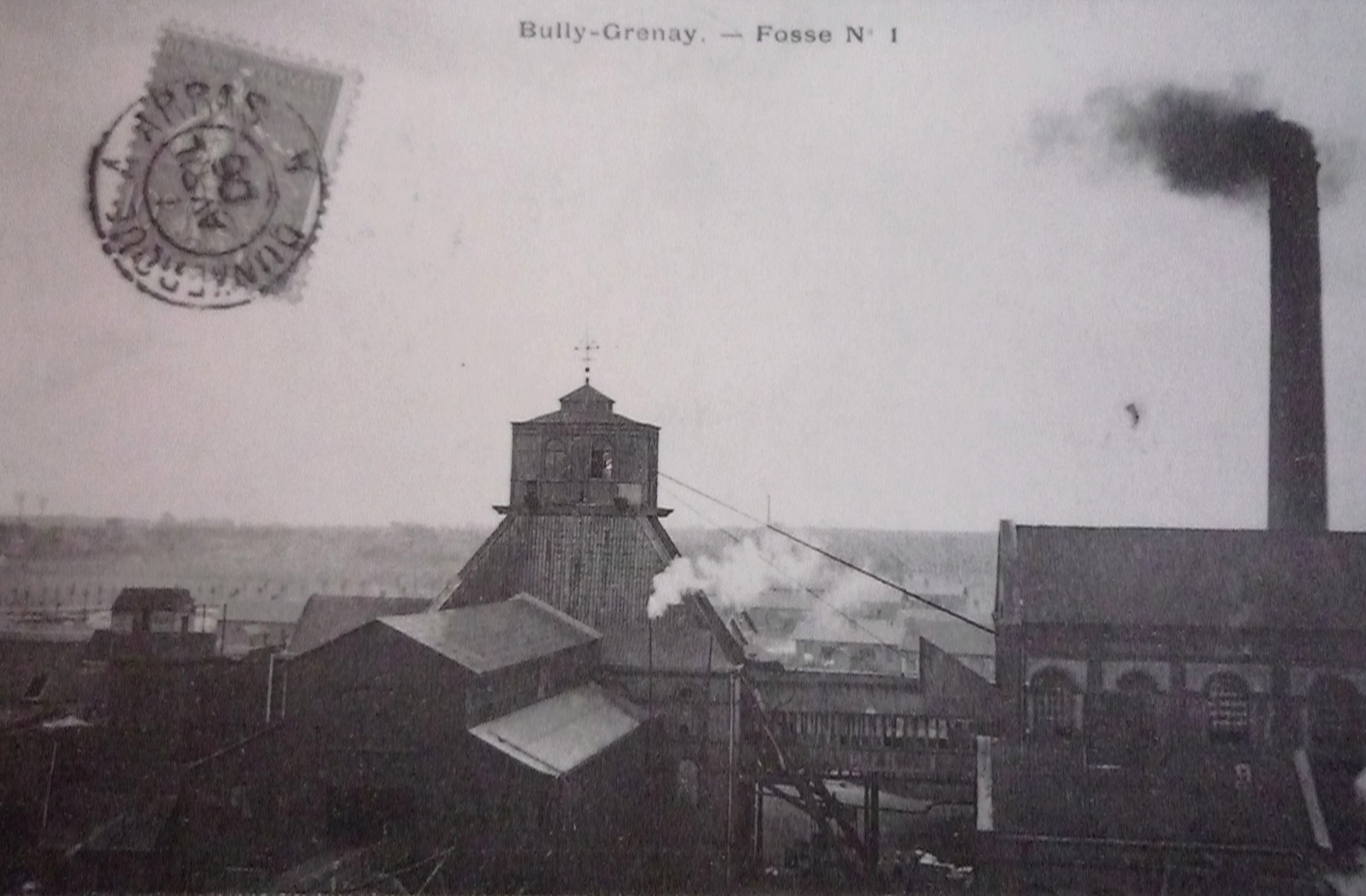
- Mine head at Bully-les-Mines c. 1900
- Industry: Coal mining
- Genre: Mines
- Founded: September 25, 1851; 175 years ago in Béthune, Pas-de-Calais, France
- Defunct: 1946
- Headquarters: Béthune, France

The Compagnie des mines de Béthune, sometimes called the sometimes called the Compagnie de Grenay after the name of the concession, was a French coal mining company in the Pas-de-Calais that was established in 1851 and nationalized in 1946. The company had 11 mines (Note: This article translates the French mine and siège d’extraction as "mine", and puit or fosse as "shaft". A mine often had a main shaft for extraction and another for ventilation. Thus Mine 4 had shaft 4 for extraction and shaft 4bis for ventilation. Some mines shared ventilation shafts, and some shafts were used for both extraction and ventilation. Underground, the galleries often extended between mines, forming a single interconnected complex.), each with one or more shafts for extraction of coal or ventilation. It had a large facility for screening and washing raw coal, and for producing coke and other secondary products. During World War I (1914–1918) the front line crossed the mining concession, with the northern part occupied by the Germans, but despite constant shelling production of coal continued. Coke production peaked at 565,195 tons in 1928. The company had two thermal electricity plants, and operated 159 kilometres (99 mi) of railway tracks. At its peak the company was one of the largest coal mining operations in the region, with 12,640 employees in 1945.

Location in France

== Corporate history ==
=== Early years 1847–1859 ===
Mine locations in Pas-de-Calais

Many soundings were conducted in the Pas-de-Calais from 1847, showing that the Valenciennes coal basin extended westward. The Société des mines de Béthune was constituted on 1 October 1850 to explore for coal in the Pas-de-Calais department. Founders were the Boitelle brothers, Constant Quentin, Petit-Courtin, André Courtrai and Courtray-Copin. The company explored the area west of Béthune, which had not yet been surveyed by other companies, making the first drilling at Annezin, where coal was found on 26 April 1851. Further test drills at Fouquières, Haillicourt and Bruay found coal at depths between 130 and 182 metres (427 and 597 ft). Based on the favorable results, the exploratory company was changed to an exploitation company on 25 September 1851.

Another exploration company, the Société des mines de Bruay, was formed in 1851 to explore for coal in the region by Leconte, Lalou and others. The owners of the Mines de Béthune acquired shares in this company, and on 13 April 1852 the six partners of Bruay sold to Constant Quentin, Petit-Courtin, Joseph Tellier, Alexis Boitelle and Lobez, in their capacity of president and members of the society of Bethune, all the results of their soundings and their rights.

M. Dusouich, an engineer from the Arras mines, advised the administrators of the Mines de Béthune to abandon work they had started in the Bruay and Béthune region and to establish themselves in the area between Lens and Nœux. The first site was near the village of Bully (today Bully-les-Mines), with 400 inhabitants. The land was poorly wooded, so the company had to bring timber and workers from Cambrai. On 17 February 1852 the drill hole reached coal at 146 metres (479 ft). Sinking of Mine 1 at Bully began on 26 March 1852, and the mine came into operation in 1853.

An imperial decree of 15 January 1853 granted the Compagnie de Béthune, created by act of 25 September 1851 and represented by Constant Quentin, Petit Courtin and Joseph Lobez, the concession for coal mines in the communes of Haisnes, Auchy, Violaines, Cuinchy, Beuvry, Sailly, Labourse, Sains, Bouvigny, Aix, Liévin, Loos, Hulluch, Cambrin, Annequin, Noyelles, Vermelles, Mazingarbe, Grenay and Bully in the arrondissement of Béthune, Pas-de-Calais. The concession was named the Grenay concession. The 5,176 hectares (12,790 acres) Grenay concession lay between the Noeux and Lens concessions. At first the company had great difficulty disposing of the products, which had to be transport by horse-drawn carts to Arras, where it could be transferred to barges or railway cars. An attempt to form a company to make coke near the canal at Violaines in 1856 failed.

=== Expansion 1859–1914 ===
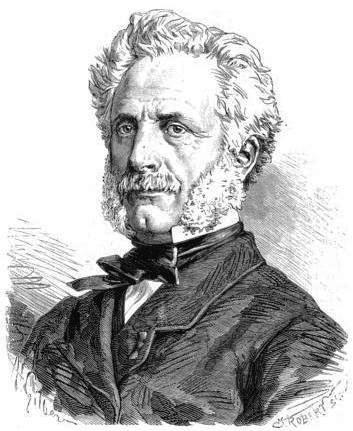
Charles Ignace Plichon, President from 1873 to 1883

The company decided to connect their mines by rail to the waterways and to the projected new railways. In December 1859 a decree allowed the company to build a railway from Bully to Violaines. Decrees of 29 August 1863 and 8 March 1865 authorized the Mines de Béthune to extend their railway network to Béthune and Lille. A limited company named the Compagnie du Chemin de fer de Lille à Béthune et à Bully-Grenay was formed on 11 May 1865 to operate the railway. Additional mines were sunk between 1859 and 1909 in Vermelles, Loos-en-Gohelle, Mazingarbe, Auchy-les-Mines, Annequin, Sains-en-Gohelle and Grenay. Coal was typically reached at a depth of 135 to 150 metres (443 to 492 ft). The coal had increasingly volatile content ranging from 9.5% in the north to 34–38% in the south.

Charles Ignace Plichon (1814–1888) was Deputy of Nord and Minister of Public Works in 1870. He was the son-in-law of Alexis Boitelle, an administrator of the Company, and became an administrator himself. He was president of the administrative council from 1873 to 1883, when he resigned, apparently due to a conflict with Bouitelle. The company faced many difficulties during his term of office, and had only moderate growth, since neither Plichon nor Boitelle had technical training.

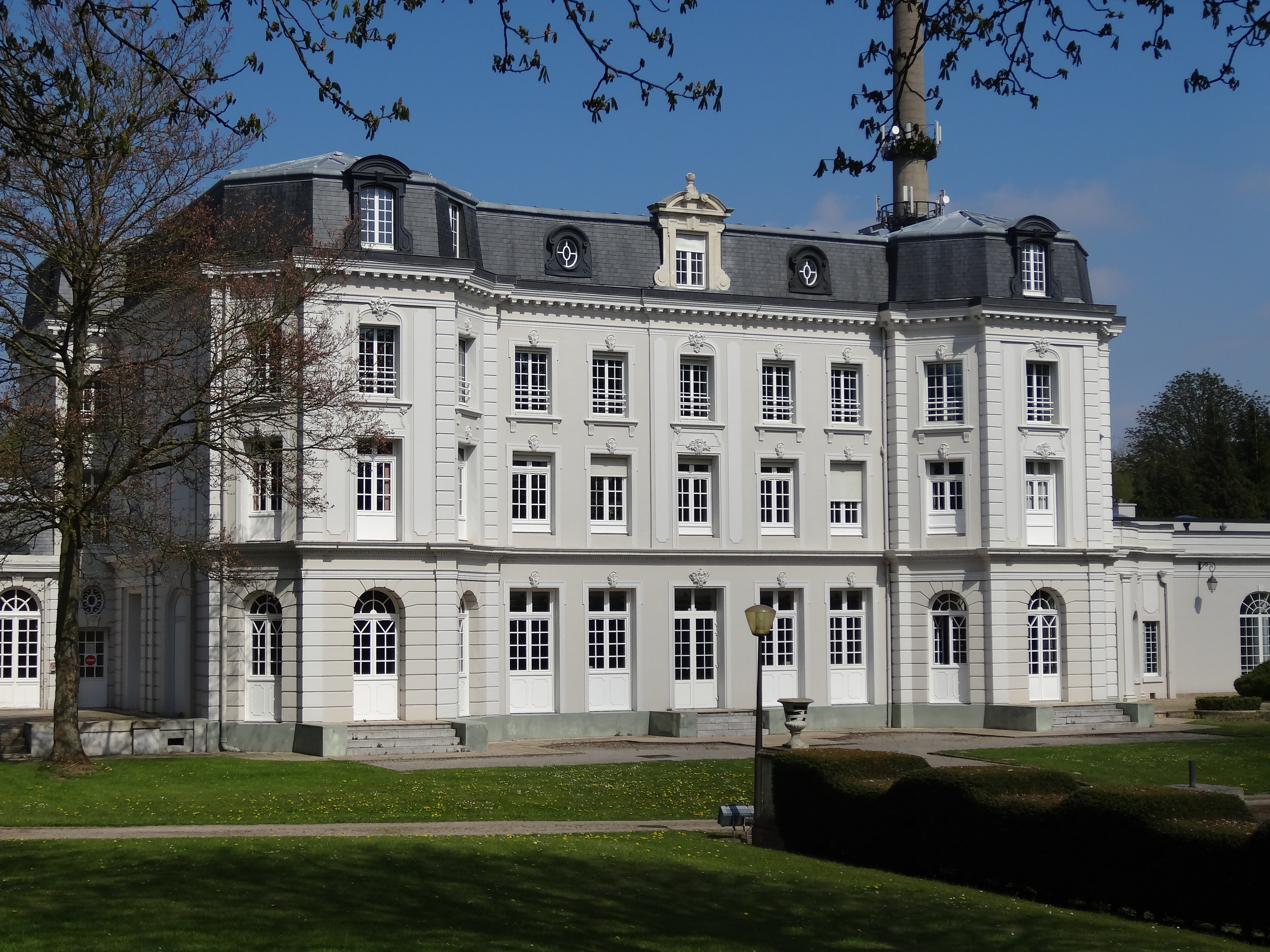
Château Mercier, residence of the director-general of the company. The building was damaged by shellfire during World War I, restored after the war.

Louis Mercier (1856–1927) was made director-general of the Mines de Béthune in 1877 and became a member of the Comité des forges in 1878. With the appointment of Mercier, helped by an improvement in the economic situation, the mines became more prosperous. After a survey of the Aix-Noulette region, the original concession was increased to an area of 6,352 hectares (15,700 acres) by an act of 1877. An 1881 encyclopedia entry described the concession as covering 5,761 hectares in the Pas-de-Calais, with 6 or 7 mines. It produced 231,711 tons in 1870, 220,519 tons in 1871, 200,817 tons in 1872, 253,124 tons in 1873 and 279,526 tons in 1874. Coal production steadily increased, interrupted only by World War I (1914-18) and the 1932 economic crisis.

Ignace Plichon's son Jean Plichon (1863–1936) graduated as an engineer from the École Centrale. Jean Plichon became a mining engineer at the Mines de Béthune in 1886. When his father died in 1888 he replaced his father in the General Council of Nord, and the next year was elected Deputy on a monarchist platform. He also succeeded his father as an administrator of the company. He became one of the leading industrialists of northern France, president of the Béthune, Blanzy and Sainte-Thérèse mining companies, and a member of a dozen or more boards of directors.

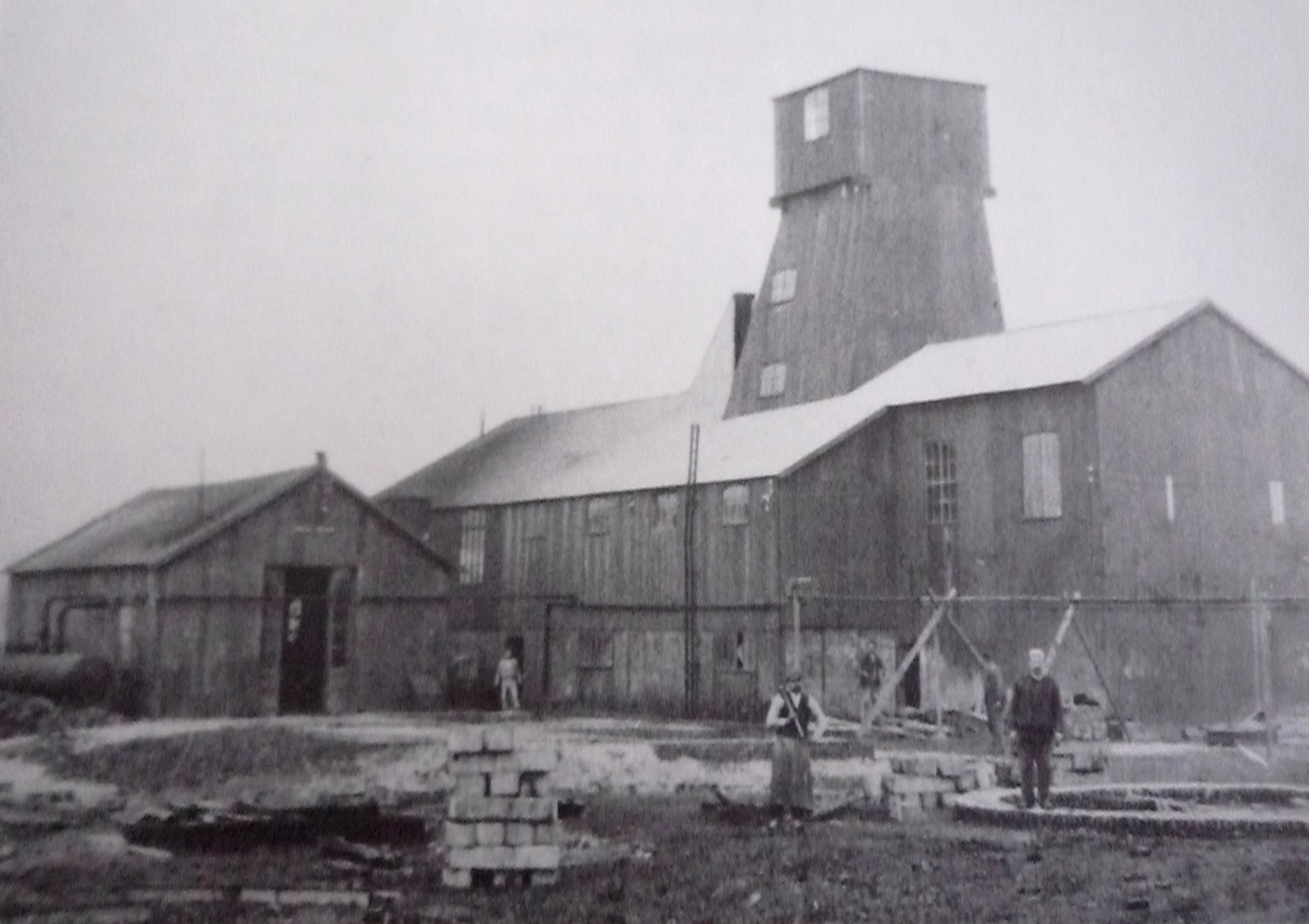
Mine 12 at Annequin c. 1909

=== World War 1914–1918 ===
The German offensive in the summer of 1914 only invaded the eastern part of the Pas-de-Calais mining region. After the first Battle of the Marne from 6–10 September 1914, the "Race to the Sea" established a front line that cut through the mining basin. The Germans were stopped to the east of Vermelles. The concession was cut in two along a line from Auchy-les-Mines to Liévin, with Mines 4 and 8 occupied by the Germans. The men who had not yet been mobilized were evacuated on 4 October 1914 in the face of the German advance, and production was suspended until 22 October 1914. Mine 4 (Vermelles) was recovered in December 1914, but Mine 8 (Auchy) was not recovered until the German troops withdrew at the end of the war. The British liberated Loos in the Battle of Loos of 25 September – 8 October 1915. This front was then relatively stable throughout the war.

From October 1914 to the summer of 1918 the Mines de Béthune were continuously bombarded by German artillery, which destroyed much of its infrastructure. The surface installations of mines 4, 5 (Loos-en-Gohelle) and 7 (Mazingarbe) were totally destroyed. All the other mines were damaged by the artillery fire. The rotunda at Loos-en-Gohelle, a circular structure for storing locomotives, was destroyed on 20 May 1915. Occupation of 2/3 of the mining basin of the departments of Nord and Pas-de-Calais by the Germans was a disaster to the French, since the basin provided almost 75% of French coal production before the war. Average daily production fell from 8,000 tons in 1913 to 1,000 tons in 1916. Production fell from 2,423,000 tons in 1913 to 332,000 tons in 1915–16.

The concession was cut by trenches that constantly changed as the front advanced and retreated. Only five extraction sites could be kept open, in the communes of Aix-Noulette, Bouvigny-Boyeffles, Bully-les-Mines, Grenay, Mazingarbe, Sains-en-Gohelle and Vermelles. These continued to supply raw coal to the war economy. Before the war the director Louis Mercier had diversified into manufacture of coke and a small tar distillery, but during the war only production of unprocessed raw coal continued. Operations were made very difficult by the bombardment. The presence of the front a few kilometers from La Bassée, Loos-en-Gohelle, Lens and Notre-Dame de Lorette put the Mines de Béthune in the front line. All types of infrastructure were destroyed including headframes, buildings, rotundas, power stations and railway lines, with work halted while they were repaired.

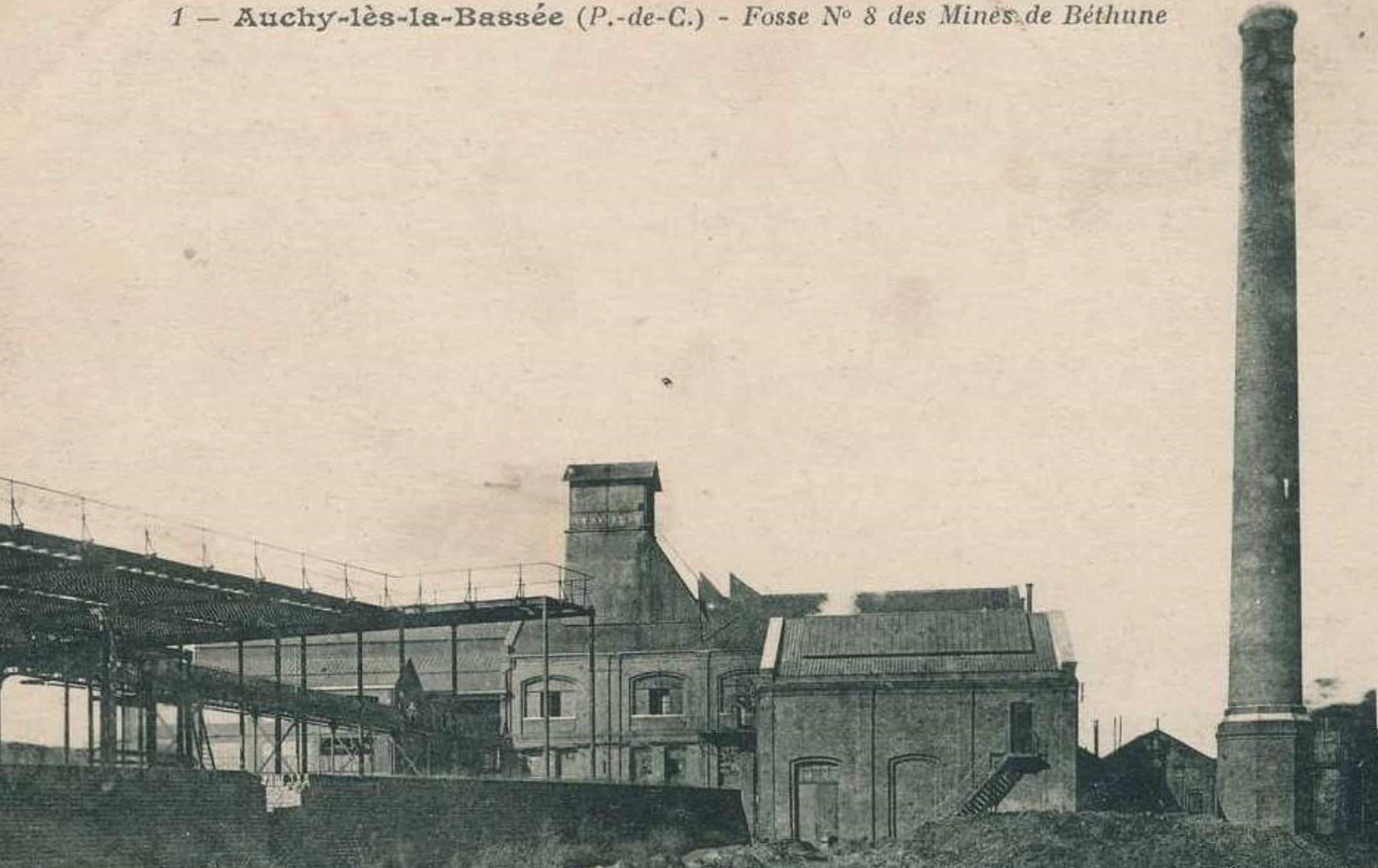
Mine 8, Auchy, c. 1910

In September 1917 the Béthune concession was a quadrilateral with an area of 13,500 hectares (33,000 acres) dominated by the summits of Haisnes, Grenay, Bouvigny and Beuvry. The east, west and north sides were mine galleries between shafts for extraction and ventilation. A long gallery led to Mine 8 in Auchy in the northeast. The Germans were concerned about infiltration of the allies via the mines, and therefore destroyed the mine shafts, headframes and pumps. Shaft 8 was blocked by the Germans between the 240 metres (790 ft) level and the lower level. Below the blockage the French could freely work the coal seams, even under the German side. Pumps were brought back into service below the shafts to drain the sector. Barricades were built as early as 1916 along the main axes of the mine complex so it could be defended while allowing ventilation and the passage of men. Mines 3 and 4 in Vermelles were isolated from the rest of the mines by watertight doors.

British soldiers of the 170th Tunneling Company established a listening system at the bottom of shaft 8bis which picked up sounds of activity in August 1917. In early September there was an underground struggle in which the Germans were forced out of the mine. Around midnight of 25–26 September 1917 the 38th German Pioneer Regiment poured about 8 tons of the suffocating gas chloropicrin into Mine 8, and carried by the ventilation systems the gas took under four hours to travel the 6 kilometres (3.7 mi) to Mine 9 and the shaft of Mine 12. The people around the base of Shaft 8 died, but those further away escaped via the ladders of Shaft 9. After the attack a thick masonry wall was built in the main haulage gallery to isolate the sectors near shafts 8 and 8bis. The Germans blew up the casing of Shaft 8 and the heads of Shafts 8 and 8bis. The mines were evacuated by order of the military on 12 April 1918, and production resumed only after the final retreat of the enemy forces.

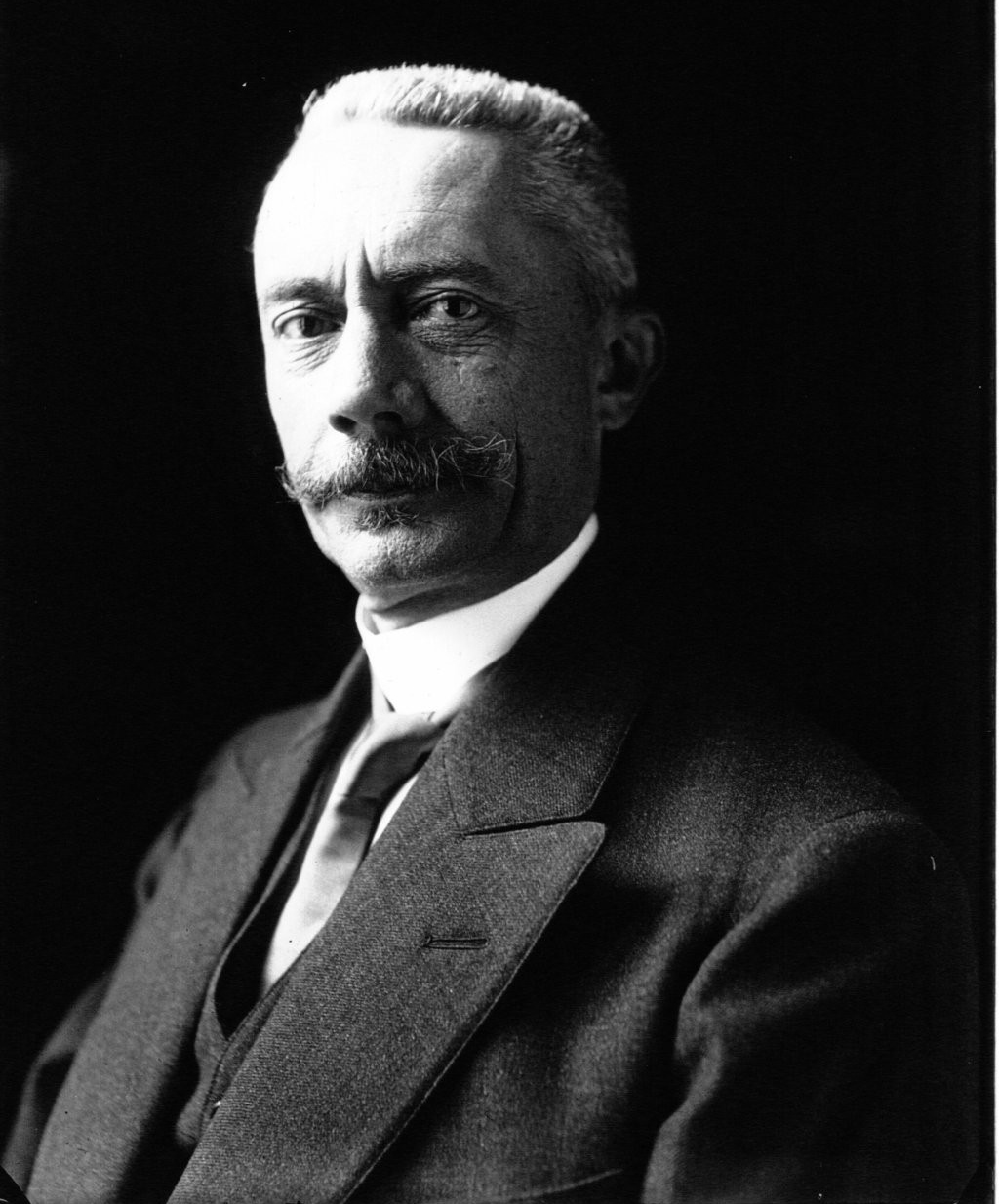
Jean Plichon (1863–1936), president of the company in 1913

=== Later history 1918–1946 ===
After the armistice of November 1918 the company began to modernise its facilities, gradually replacing steam power by electricity, and developing new methods of extracting coal from the seams. The 11 mines did not achieve full production until 1924. A monument to the personnel of the mines de Béthune who had died in the war, with bas-reliefs by the sculptor Paul Capelacre, was inaugurated in October 1924. It held the names of 955 dead, 847 who had been killed as soldiers and 108 while working under fire.

In 1924 Jean Plichon, Deputy for Nord, was still president of the company and Louis Mercier was still director-general. For industries like metallurgy and coal mining, only a limited company can manage the huge amounts of capital investment required. However, the Bethune mines had become a fief of the Plichons, since Jean was succeeded by his brother Pierre and nephew Jean-Pierre Plichon. Men such as the Plichons, although they did not belong to the rich industrial bourgeoisie, were able to build great fortunes due to their political and technical skills. Ignace's younger son Pierre Plichon took to the law and became a member of the Paris Court of Appeal, then resigned and joined the board of the Bethune company. Pierre's son, Jean-Pierre Plichon (1907–1966), was an engineer of arts and manufactures. He became a liberal deputy for the Lille region.

Production of coke resumed after the war, although it was halted during the Great Depression that began in 1932. Peak output was 565,195 tons in 1928. Secondary shafts continued to be opened until 1925. The company became one of the most powerful mining operations in the area. In 1945 the concession was a quadrilateral 6 kilometres (3.7 mi) across with parts of 15 communes: Bully, Grenay, Loos, Vermelle, Mazingarbe, Noyelles, Sains en Gohelle, Auchy-les-Mines, Haisnes, Annequin, Cuinchy, Beuvry, Sailly, Lievin and Aix-Noulette.

=== Nationalization and closures 1946–1982 ===
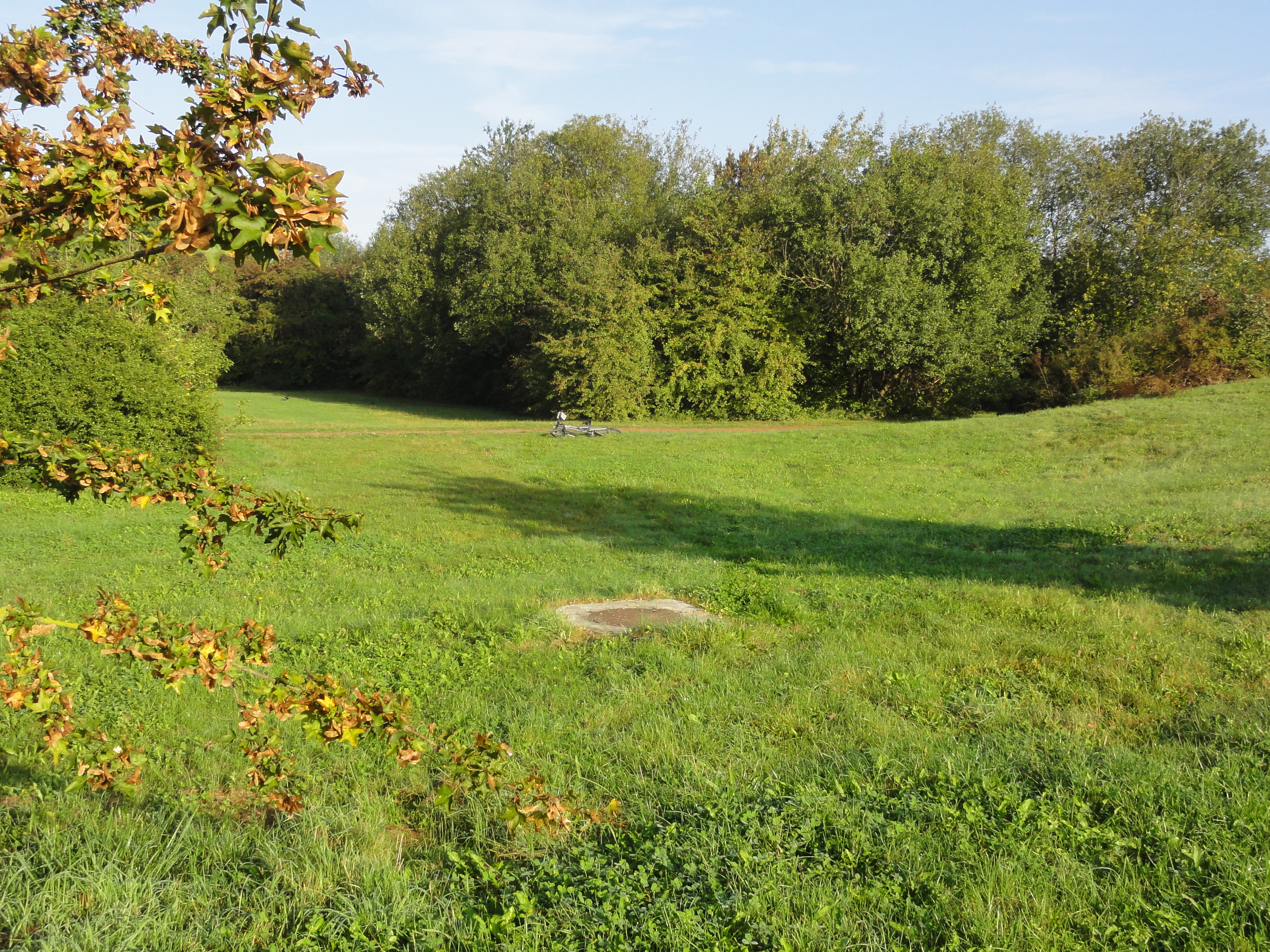
Mine 8 at Auchy-les-Mines in 2011

The company was nationalized in 1946 and became part of the Groupe de Béthune, which included the former mining companies of Noeux, Vendin-les-Béthune, Gouy-Servin-Fresnicourt and Béthune. The Groupe de Béthune was merged with the Groupe de Lens in 1967.

In 1957 Mine 10 was concentrated on Mine 13 of the Bethune group. In 1959 Mine 2 was concentrated on Mine 1, and in 1961 Mine 1 was in turn concentrated on Mine 13 of the Bethune Group. Mine 6 was concentrated on Mine 13 of the Béthune Group in 1961, providing access and ventilation. Mine 8 was concentrated on Mine 18 of the Lens group in 1961. Mines were closed and back-filled between 1962 and 1977. The headframes of Mine 5 were demolished in 1969 and 1970, leaving only the entrance gate. Demolitions continued between 1971 and 1982. The headframe of Shaft 1ter, which had unique architecture, was destroyed in 1973. Mine 3, the last remaining mine, was back-filled in 1977.

== Facilities ==
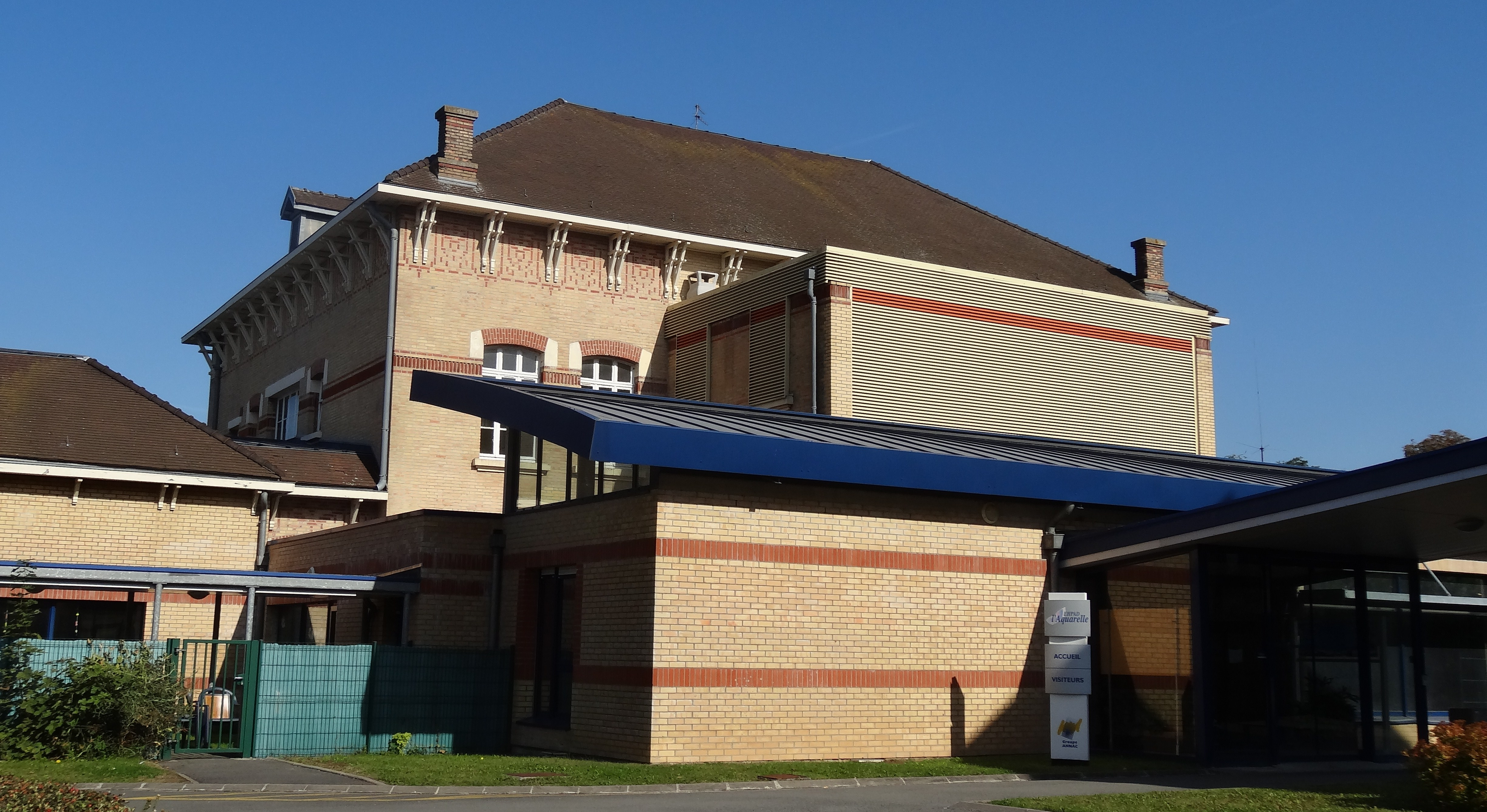
Sainte-Barbe Maternity Clinic

Factories were created at Mazingarbe in 1895 to process the coal. Some were used to screen and wash the raw coal. By 1945 the facility could wash 400 tons of raw coal per hour. The coking plant had four batteries of ovens to process washed coal, and produced 100,000 tons per year from 1899 to 1906, 200,000 tons in 1912 and 392,700 tons in 1913. Additional workshop manufactured products such as ammonia, sodium nitrate, methanol, formaldehyde and ether.

All the concession services required large amounts of electricity. A thermal power station was built at Bully in 1905, and a second at Mazingarbe in 1931. Surplus power was delivered to the Société électrique du Nord Ouest. A railway system with 159 kilometres (99 mi) of track connected all the facilities, crossed from north to south by a main line that connected the northern network to Bully-Grenay and Violaines. By 1945 there were 1,300 cars and 27 locomotives. At Violaines the company had a basin to load barges, connected to the Canal d'Aire at la Bassée.

At first, Bully had just 400 inhabitants. By 1875 there were 2,161 employees and 867 houses. By 1945 there were 12,640 employees and 7,790 dwellings. The towns had schools, churches, sports fields and stadiums. There were many social projects to help people in difficulty, and the company had a medical and hygiene organization with a dispensary, clinic, infant centers and medical staff. The Étoile Sportive de Bully was founded in 1920 by the Company with a sports complex considered the most modern in France. There were five football pitches, one with stands for several hundred spectators, dressing rooms with showers, individual lockers for players. Members could also practice gymnastics, boxing and athletics.

Mining towns were built near the mine in a distinctive architectural style. Cité n°5 (Town 5) was built on a rectangular grid pattern between 1900 and 1925 to the south of spoil tip 58a for the workers in No. 5 mine. Houses built before 1914 are semi-detached, with a simple architectural style, central dormer windows and very discreet brick patterns on the façade. The houses built after the war have more complex roof lines and porches. The 1925 Eglise Saint-Louis was built following plans by the architect Gustave Umbdenstock. It is a red brick Romanesque church with Art Deco elements. There is a school with two long red brick buildings, one for girls and one for boys. The Cité des quarante to the west was built for workers in Mine 6 between 1913 and 1927, with a mix of straight and curved streets. It consists entirely of pairs of semi-detached houses surrounded by gardens. The broken roof lines and porches are typical of the company.

== Mines ==
=== Bully-les-Mines ===
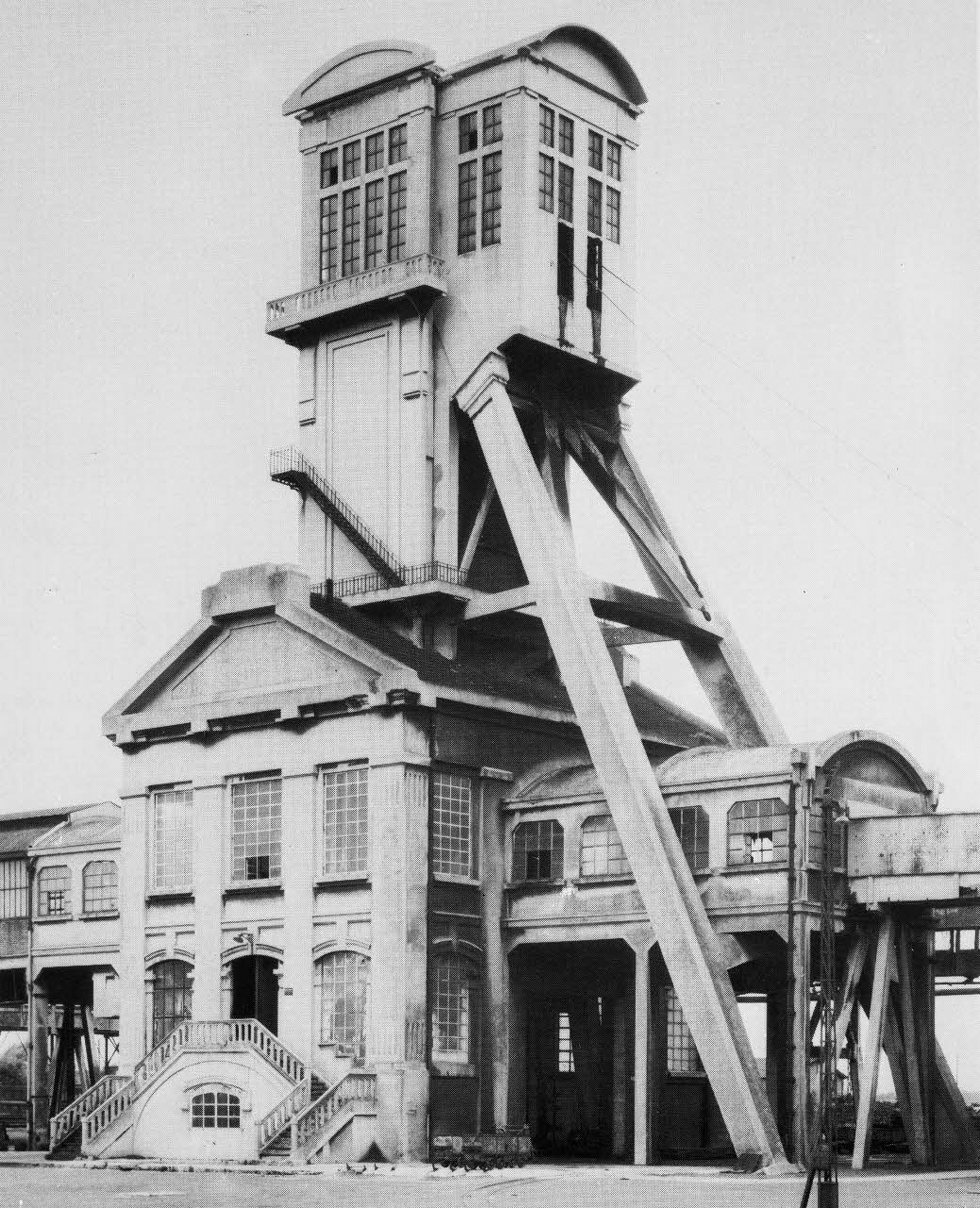
Mine 1 at Bully-les-Mines c. 1930

Excavation of Mine 1 started in March 1852 at Bully-les-Mines with a mine shaft diameter of 4 to 5.75 metres (13.1 to 18.9 ft), reaching coal at 136 metres (446 ft). Production started in 1853, when 7,000 tons of coal were extracted. This rose to 21,000 tons the next year. In 1865 a more modern engine was installed with two horizontal cylinders. In November 1869 eighteen workers were asphyxiated by fumes from a fire. Mine 1 was completely renovated in 1876, with a new 450 horsepower (340 kW) engine installed. By 1880 Mine 1 had produced a total of 1,280,000 tons of coal, and had reached a depth of 443 metres (1,453 ft). Shaft 1bis was added in 1889 and Shaft 1ter in 1911.

Excavation of Mine 2, with a diameter of 4 metres (13 ft), was started on 20 November 1855 at Bully-les-Mines, and reached coal at 135.5 metres (445 ft). The shaft passed through an underground aquifer, for which a pumping machine was needed. Extraction started in February 1859 in a very rugged deposit. In 1868 the Davaine ventilator in Mine 2 was no longer adequate and had to be replaced. By 1880 Mine 2 had produced 720,000 tons in total and was 450 metres (1,480 ft) deep.

=== Vermelles ===
Excavation of Mine 3 in Vermelles began in January 1857, reaching a rugged, steeply inclined deposit of coal at 147 metres (482 ft). Extraction started in July 1860. Air compressors were installed in Mine 3 1877. This proved the most productive mine, with a total of 1,525,000 tons. Excavation of Mine 4 at Vermelles started in October 1865 and reached coal at 149 metres (489 ft). Extraction started in 1867. Mine 4 was abandoned in 1876 because the very irregular deposit at 250 metres (820 ft) seemed unusable. There was a lot of firedamp compared to other mines. Mine 4 was reopened and extraction resumed at 387 metres (1,270 ft) in 1911. The main shaft reached 389 metres (1,276 ft). Shaft 4bis was opened to the north in 1925 for ventilation, 301 metres (988 ft) deep.

=== Loos-en-Gohelle ===
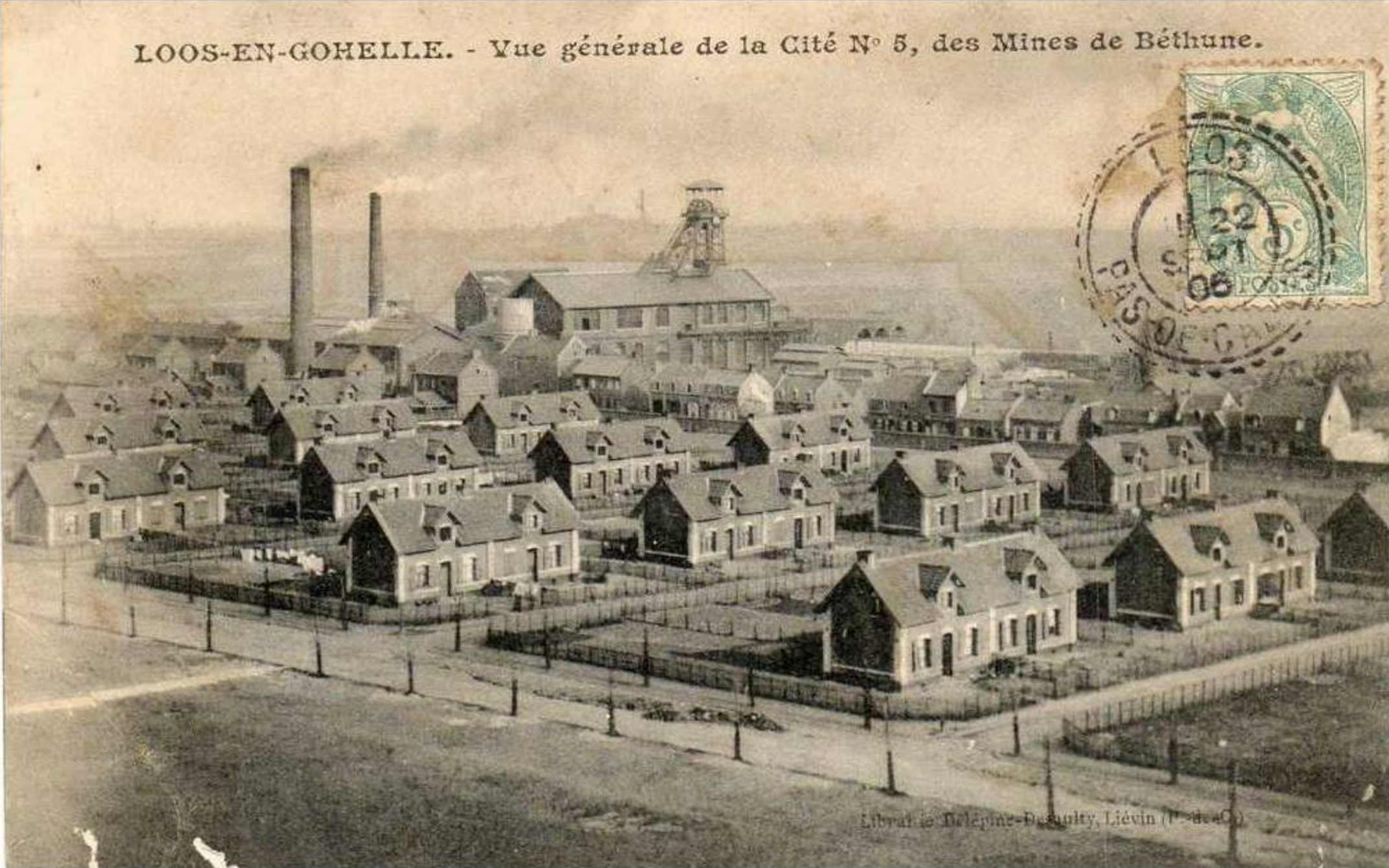
Shaft 5/5bis at Loos-en-Gohelle around 1906

Excavation of the 4.5 metres (15 ft) Mine 5 in Loos-en-Gohelle started in April 1873, reaching a slightly inclined bed of coal at 150 metres (490 ft). A vein of coal 1.55 metres (5 ft 1 in) thick was found at 152 metres (499 ft) and veins of 80 and 85 centimetres (31 and 33 in) at 167 metres (548 ft). Extraction started in May 1875. Compressed air machines were used to drilling and mechanical traction. Mine 5 was very productive, with 335,000 tons already extracted by 1880. Shaft 5bis was added in 1901. Shaft 5 and 5bis reached depths of 483 and 735 metres (1,585 and 2,411 ft). Mine 5 eventually produced 24,7411,000 tons of coal.

=== Mazingarbe ===
Excavation of Mine 6 at Mazingarbe began in October 1874 and reached an irregular bed of coal at 144 metres (472 ft). Extraction began in 1876 using a 450 horsepower (340 kW) extraction machine. Mine 6 was connected to Mine 1 in 1877. Shaft 6bis was opened in August 1885. Mine 7 was started in April 1875 at Mazingarbe, and reached coal at 137 metres (449 ft). Extraction started in May 1877 using the old extraction machine from Mine 1. Shaft 7bis was added in 1905.

=== Other locations ===
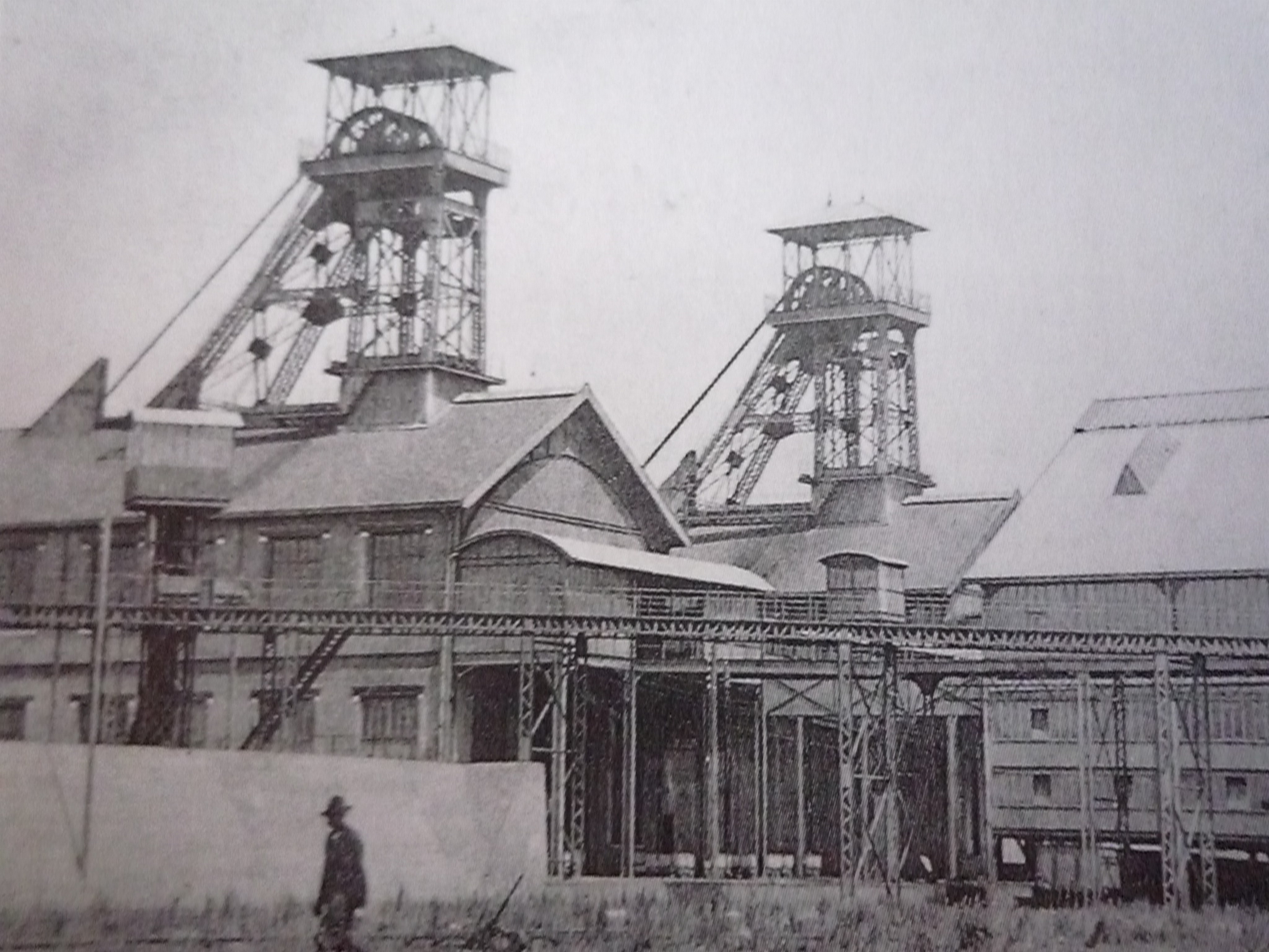
Sains-en-Gohelle Heads of shafts 10 and 10bis c. 1910

Work on Mine 8 at Auchy-les-Mines began in July 1891, and the mine was opened in November 1893. Shaft 8bis was started in November 1893. Excavation of Mine 9 began in 1893 at Annequin. Mine 9 began production in 1896, ventilated by shafts 4bis and 12. Excavation of Mine 10 started in July 1900 at Sains-en-Gohelle, and eventually reached 730 metres (2,400 ft). Shaft 10bis was started in July 1901 and reached 791 metres (2,595 ft). Production started in 1903. Excavation of Mine 11 at Grenay began in October 1904. Excavation of Shaft 11bis, for ventilation, began in May 1906. Extraction started in April 1908. Shaft 12 was started at Annequin in February 1909 and reached a depth of 520 metres (1,710 ft). It was connected to Mine 9 and was used only for ventilation.

The main mines, to which secondary ventilation or extraction shafts were often added, were:

Shaft	Location	Started	Open	Depth	Closed / Combined	Back- filled	Headframe destroyed
1	Bully-les-Mines	1852	1853	583 metres (1,913 ft)	1961	1971	1973
1bis	Bully-les-Mines		1899	430 metres (1,410 ft)	1961	1971	1973
1ter	Bully-les-Mines		1911	587 metres (1,926 ft)	1961	1971	1973
2	Bully-les-Mines	1855	1859	450 metres (1,480 ft)	1968	1970	1974
3	Vermelles	1857	1860	464 metres (1,522 ft)		1977	
4	Vermelles	1865	1867	387 metres (1,270 ft)		1965	
4bis	Vermelles		1925	301 metres (988 ft)		1965	
5	Loos-en-Gohelle	1873	1875	483 metres (1,585 ft)		1969	1970
5bis	Loos-en-Gohelle		1901	735 metres (2,411 ft)		1969	1970
6	Mazingarbe	1874	1876	472 metres (1,549 ft)	1964	1968	1982
6bis	Mazingarbe		1885	372 metres (1,220 ft)	1964	1968	1982
7	Mazingarbe	1875	1877	483 metres (1,585 ft)	1965	1965	
7bis	Mazingarbe		1877	398 metres (1,306 ft)	1965	1968	
8	Auchy-les-Mines	1891	1893	367 metres (1,204 ft)	1961	1962	
8bis	Auchy-les-Mines	1893		399 metres (1,309 ft)	1961	1974	
9	Annequin	1893	1896	527 metres (1,729 ft)	1964	1964	
10	Sains-en-Gohelle	1900	1903	730 metres (2,400 ft)	1957	1972	1975
10bis	Sains-en-Gohelle	1901	1903	791 metres (2,595 ft)	1957	1972	1975
11	Grenay	1904	1908	640 metres (2,100 ft)		1967	1969
11bis	Grenay	1906	1908	749 metres (2,457 ft)		1967	1969
12	Annequin	1909		520 metres (1,710 ft)		1965	1965

== Sources ==
- Bouguereau, Rémi; Leignel, Valentine; Piernas, Gersende (2008), 1994 026: Houillères du Bassin Nord-pas-de-Calais Mines De Béthune (Pas-de-Calais) (PDF) (in French), Archives Nationales
- Compagnie de Béthune (in French), Association MINING, archived from the original on 2017-07-31
- de Moulon (1859), Jurisprudence de la cour impériale de Douai, ... (in French), France
- Emerit, Marcel (1974), "Du saint-simonisme au catholicisme : Ignace Plichon, député du Nord", Revue du Nord (in French), 56 (220): 29–42, doi:10.3406/rnord.1974.3210
- Jolly, Jean (1977), "PLICHON Jean", Dictionnaire des Parlementaires français (in French), Senate of France
- La compagnie des mines de Béthune pendant la Première Guerre mondiale (in French), Archives du Pas-de-Calais
- Laforgerie, Eric (2013), "Une attaque par gaz dans les mines de Bethune", Les souterrains de la grande guerre (in French), Ysec Editions, ISBN 978-2846731652
- Lami, Eugène-Oscar (1881), Dictionnaire encyclopédique et biographique de l'industrie et des arts industriels (in French), Librairie des dictionnaires
- Le quartier de la cité n°5 (PDF) (in French), UNESCO
- "L'Étoile sportive de Bully-les-Mines", Le Magazine du Mineur (in French), 4 October 1959
- "Mercier, Louis", Patrons de France (in French), Système d'Information Patrons et Patronat Français
- "Monument aux morts des personnels des mines de Béthune", Mémoires de Pierre (in French)
- Napoleon III (1852), Annales des mines: Partie administrative, Dunod
