= Bully-les-Mines =

- Commune
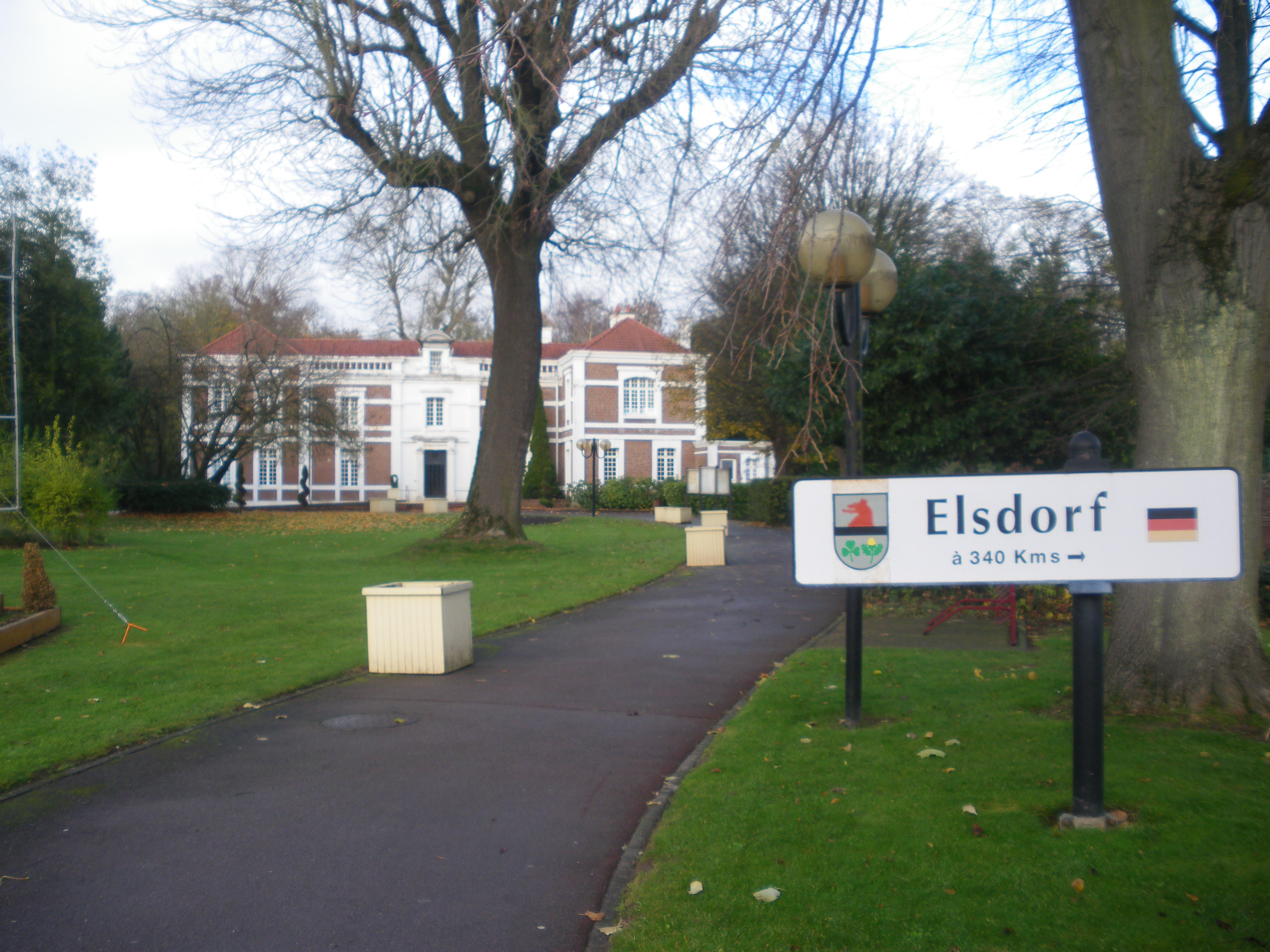
- The town hall of Bully-les-Mines

- Coat of arms
- Location of Bully-les-Mines
- Location within France Location within Hauts-de-France
- Coordinates: 50°26′33″N 2°43′31″E
- Country: France
- Region: Hauts-de-France
- Department: Pas-de-Calais
- Arrondissement: Lens
- Canton: Bully-les-Mines
- Intercommunality: CA Lens-Liévin

Government
  - Mayor (2020–2026): François Lemaire
- Area^{1}: 7.66 km^{2} (2.96 sq mi)
- Elevation: 19 m (62 ft)
- Highest elevation: 92 m (302 ft)
- Lowest elevation: 38 m (125 ft)
- Population (2023): 12,146
  - Density: 1,590/km^{2} (4,110/sq mi)
- Time zone: UTC+01:00 (CET)
  - Summer (DST): UTC+02:00 (CEST)
- INSEE/Postal code: 62186 /62160
- ^{1} French Land Register data, which excludes lakes, ponds, glaciers > 1 km^{2} (0.386 sq mi or 247 acres) and river estuaries.

Bully-les-Mines (French pronunciation: [byli le min]) is a commune in the Pas-de-Calais département in northern France. It forms part of the Lens-Liévin agglomeration community, which encompasses 36 French communes and 250,000 inhabitants. For many years it was a major coal mining center.

== History ==
The name of Bully-les-Mines has frequently had various forms over the centuries: from Bulgi (in 1135), to Bugi (1152), Builli (1157), Bullia (1198), Bully (1270), Boulli (1303), Buylly (1410), Builly-lez-Aix (1486), Builly-lez-Grenay (1511), Builly-en-Gohelle (1569), Bully-en-Gohelle (1709), Bully-Grenay (1750), Bully-en-Gohelle (1782), and finally Bully-les-Mines in 1925.

According to many sources, the name has Gaulish origins. Ricouart proposes that "Bullire" derives from the French "bouillonner," a reference to the source of the river Surgeon in a neighboring commune. The current use of "les mines" indicates the importance of mining to the commune and the region. The train station has maintained the older name of Bully-Grenay, leading to occasional confusion among travelers.

Although the region has been inhabited from prehistory onward, no evidence of prehistoric settlements has yet been found at Bully. The oldest relic so far discovered in the commune is a Celtic bracelet; Bully once belonged to the "Pagus Silvinus" region of the Atrébates. Gallo-Roman discoveries have been numerous within the commune.

During the sixth century, Bully came under the spiritual leadership of the bishop of Cambrai-Arras.

As an integral part of Artois, Bully fell under the domination of the Counts of Flanders from 862 to 1191 before passing with the rest of the region to French control. Governed directly by the French Crown from 1191 to 1237, the town and region remained part of France until 1384, when they submitted to the rule of Burgundy. A brief return to French control between 1477 and 1492 ended in an absorption into Spanish territory, which lasted until the region returned definitively to France with the 1659 Treaty of the Pyrenees.

=== Misfortunes of Bully ===
Bully's close proximity to three military strongholds - Arras, Béthune, and Lens - often situated it in the path of war. In 1213 the village was raided; in 1303 it was destroyed completely, even its trees cut down. In 1348 a third of the population fell to the Black Death, which returned four times in the next century, alternating with famines and wars.

In 1537 Bully was sacked by the troops of Louis XII, and similar misfortunes continued until the French took Lens in 1556-1557. By this time Bully was so destitute that the victorious French proved unable to levy a tax on its inhabitants. In 1648, the village billeted troops involved in the Battle of Lens.

From 1709 to 1712, Bully was buffeted by the advances and retreats of armies fighting in the War of the Spanish Succession, a situation aggravated by an epidemic that killed 24 villagers. In 1796, a fire destroyed half the village, an event commemorated by the present-day "Chemin brûlé."

=== Coal mining ===
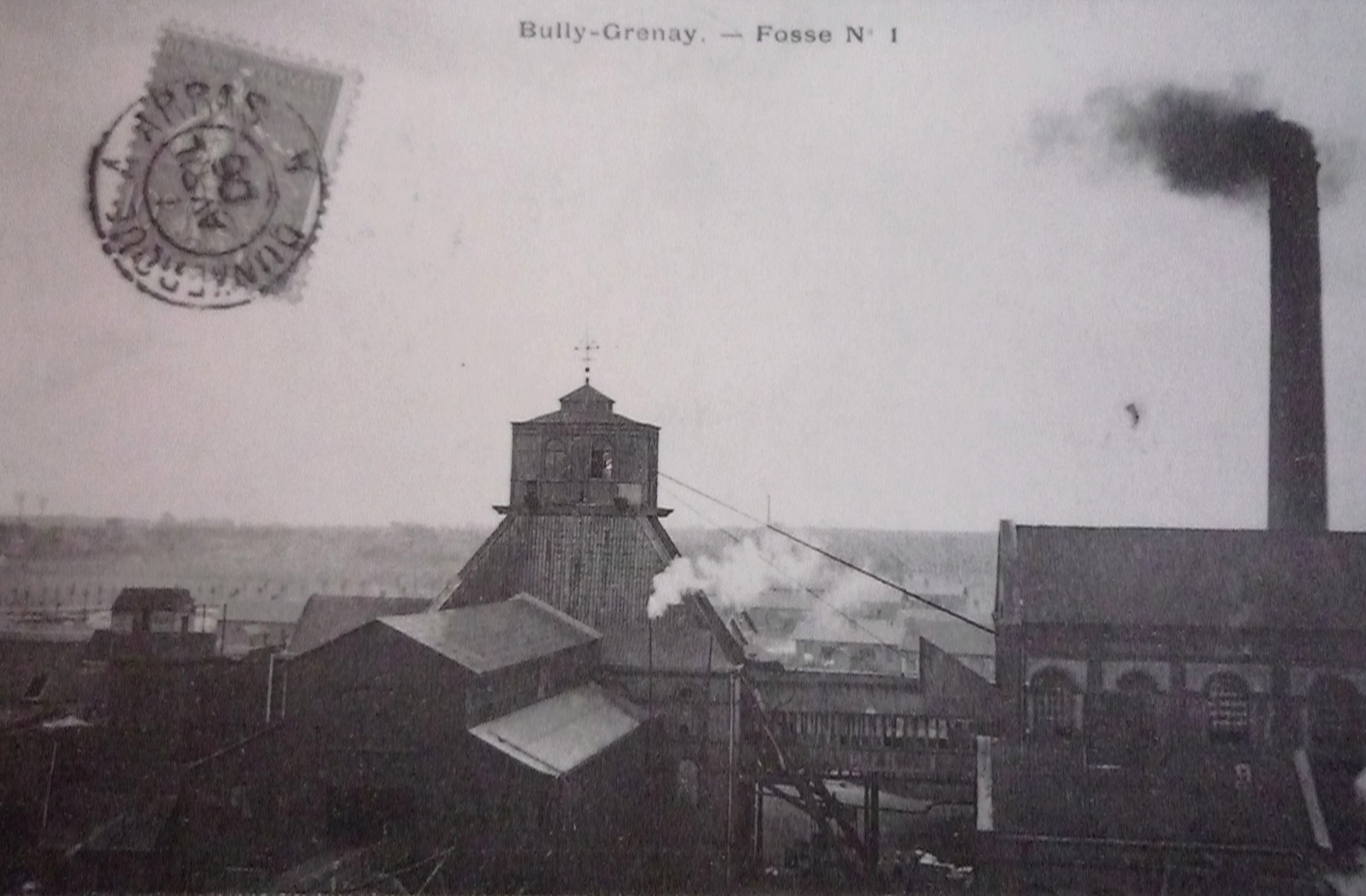
Bully-les-Mines c. 1900

In 1852 the first site explored by the Compagnie des mines de Béthune was near the village of Bully. The land was poorly wooded, so the company had to bring timber and workers from Cambrai. On 17 February 1852 the drill hole reached coal at 146 metres (479 ft). Sinking of Mine 1 at Bully began on 26 March 1852, and the mine came into operation in 1853. In 1853 7,000 tons of coal were extracted. This rose to 21,000 tons the next year. Excavation of Mine 2, with a diameter of 4 metres (13 ft), was started on 20 November 1855 at Bully-les-Mines, and reached coal at 135.5 metres (445 ft). The shaft passed through an underground aquifer, for which a pumping machine was needed. Extraction started in February 1859 in a very rugged deposit.

In December 1859 a decree allowed the company to build a railway from Bully to Violaines. Decrees of 29 August 1863 and 8 March 1865 authorized the Mines de Béthune to extend their railway network to Béthune and Lille. A limited company named the Compagnie du Chemin de fer de Lille à Béthune et à Bully-Grenay was formed on 11 May 1865 to operate the railway.

In 1865 a more modern engine was installed in Mine 1 with two horizontal cylinders. In 1868 the Davaine ventilator in Mine 2 was no longer adequate and had to be replaced. By 1880 Mine 2 had produced 720,000 tons in total and was 450 metres (1,480 ft) deep. In November 1869 eighteen workers were asphyxiated by fumes from a fire. Mine 1 was completely renovated in 1876, with a new 450 horsepower (340 kW) engine installed. By 1880 Mine 1 had produced a total of 1,280,000 tons of coal, and had reached a depth of 443 metres (1,453 ft). Shaft 1bis was added in 1889 and Shaft 1ter in 1911.

The Étoile Sportive de Bully was founded in 1920 by the Company with a sports complex considered the most modern in France. There were five football pitches, one with stands for several hundred spectators, dressing rooms with showers, individual lockers for players. Members could also practice gymnastics, boxing and athletics. Mine 1 was closed in 1961, backfilled in 1971 and the headframes destroyed in 1973. Mine 2 was closed in 1968, backfilled in 1970 and the headframe destroyed in 1974.

== Population ==
Historical population

Year	Pop.	±% p.a.
1793	410	—
1800	380	−1.08%
1806	431	+2.12%
1821	447	+0.24%
1831	495	+1.03%
1836	469	−1.07%
1841	428	−1.81%
1846	430	+0.09%
1851	453	+1.05%
1856	896	+14.62%
1861	1,448	+10.08%
1866	1,727	+3.59%
1872	2,040	+2.81%
1876	2,529	+5.52%
1881	2,797	+2.03%
1886	3,072	+1.89%
1891	3,827	+4.49%
1896	3,947	+0.62%
1901	4,722	+3.65%

Year	Pop.	±% p.a.
1906	5,851	+4.38%
1911	6,671	+2.66%
1921	7,551	+1.25%
1926	9,280	+4.21%
1931	9,597	+0.67%
1936	9,259	−0.71%
1946	10,500	+1.27%
1954	13,138	+2.84%
1962	14,183	+0.96%
1968	14,052	−0.15%
1975	12,236	−1.96%
1982	12,533	+0.34%
1990	12,577	+0.04%
1999	12,045	−0.48%
2007	12,061	+0.02%
2012	12,723	+1.07%
2017	12,163	−0.90%
2023	12,146	−0.02%

Source: EHESS and INSEE (1968-2023)

== Administration ==
Michel Vancaille, former vice-president of the Conseil Général of the Pas-de-Calais, served as mayor of Bully-les-Mines from 1989 to 2002, when he was replaced by fellow Socialist François Lemaire.

== Sights ==
The bell tower of the Church of Saint-Maclou is inscribed in the French registry of historic sites and monuments.

== Personalities ==
- David Faupala, footballer
- André Strappe, footballer
- Jean-Marie Vanlerenberghe, mayor of Arras and MoDem Senator for the Pas-de-Calais

== See also ==
- Communes of Pas-de-Calais

== Sources ==
- Bouguereau, Rémi; Leignel, Valentine; Piernas, Gersende (2008), 1994 026: Houillères du Bassin Nord-pas-de-Calais Mines De Béthune (Pas-de-Calais) (PDF) (in French), Archives Nationales
- Compagnie de Béthune (in French), Association MINING, archived from the original on 31 July 2017
- "L'Étoile sportive de Bully-les-Mines", Le Magazine du Mineur (in French), 4 October 1959

== External links (in French) ==
- The website of the Town of Bully-les-Mines
- The website of the Lens-Liévin Communaupole
- The website of the Bully-les-Mines Youth Centre
- The website of the Espace François Mitterrand in Bully-les-Mines
