= Annequin =

- Commune
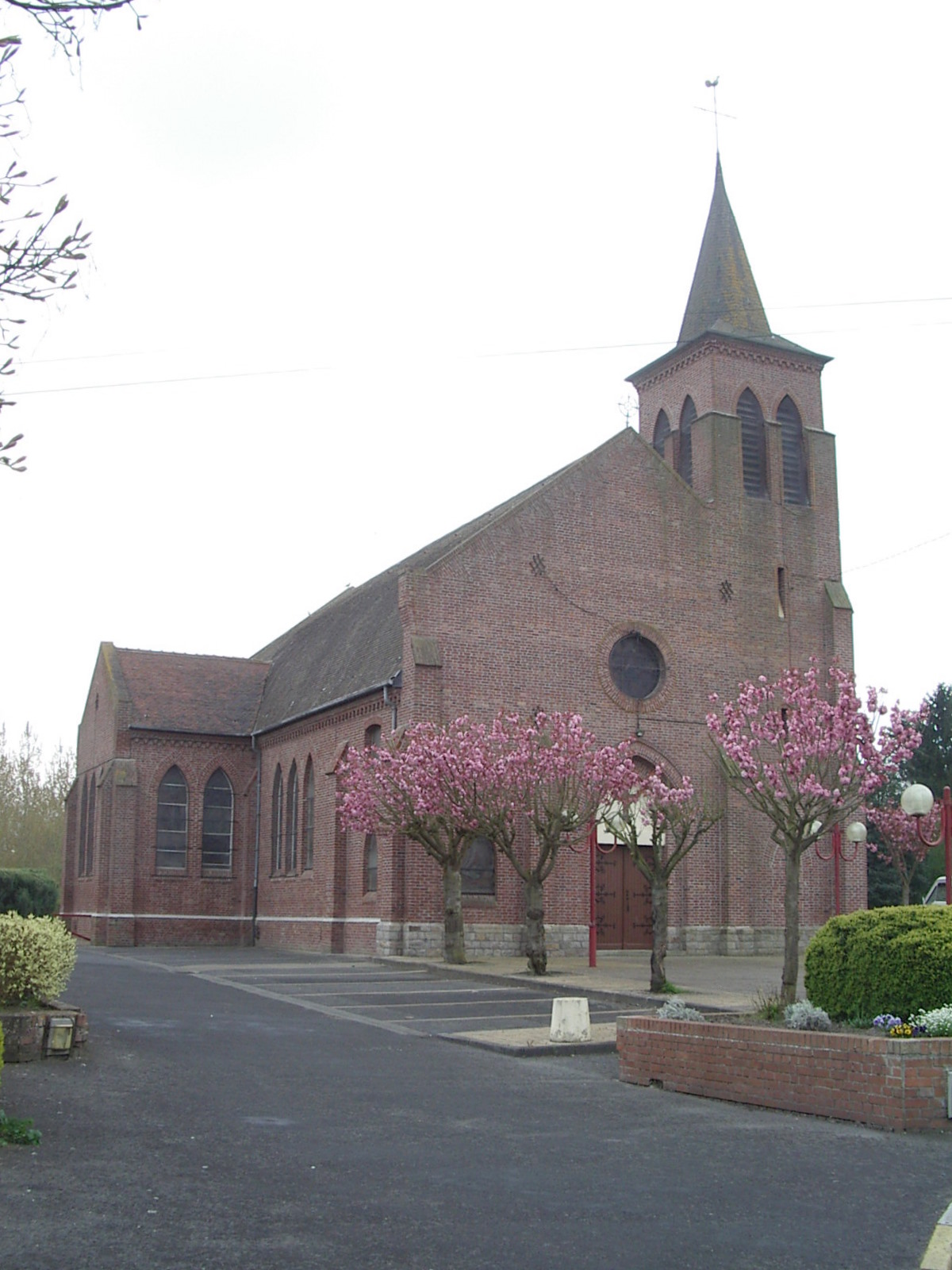
- The church of Annequin

- Coat of arms
- Location of Annequin
- Location within France Location within Hauts-de-France
- Coordinates: 50°30′28″N 2°43′33″E
- Country: France
- Region: Hauts-de-France
- Department: Pas-de-Calais
- Arrondissement: Béthune
- Canton: Douvrin
- Intercommunality: CA Béthune-Bruay, Artois-Lys Romane

Government
  - Mayor (2020–2026): Yves Dupont
- Area^{1}: 3.99 km^{2} (1.54 sq mi)
- Elevation: 23 m (75 ft)
- Highest elevation: 38 m (125 ft)
- Lowest elevation: 19 m (62 ft)
- Population (2023): 2,133
  - Density: 535/km^{2} (1,380/sq mi)
- Time zone: UTC+01:00 (CET)
  - Summer (DST): UTC+02:00 (CEST)
- INSEE/Postal code: 62034 /62149
- ^{1} French Land Register data, which excludes lakes, ponds, glaciers > 1 km^{2} (0.386 sq mi or 247 acres) and river estuaries.

Annequin (French pronunciation: [ankɛ̃]) is a commune in the Pas-de-Calais department in the Hauts-de-France region of France.

== Geography ==
Annequin is a large farming (and ex-mining) village situated some 4 miles (6.4 km) east of Béthune and 22 miles (35 km) southwest of Lille, at the junction of the D61 and the N41 roads.

== Coal mining ==
Excavation of Mine 9 by the Compagnie des mines de Béthune began at Annequin in 1893. Mine 9 began production in 1896, ventilated by shaft 4bis. Shaft 12 was started at Annequin in February 1909 and reached a depth of 520 metres (1,710 ft). It was connected to Mine 9 and was used only for ventilation. Mine 9 was closed in 1964 and Shaft 12 in 1965.

== Population ==
Historical population
Year	Pop.	±% p.a.
1968	2,101	—
1975	1,897	−1.45%
1982	1,912	+0.11%
1990	2,086	+1.09%
1999	2,157	+0.37%
2007	2,331	+0.97%
2012	2,413	+0.69%
2017	2,201	−1.82%
2023	2,133	−0.52%
Source: INSEE

== Sights ==
- The church of St. Martin, dating from the twentieth century.
- Remains of a 13th-century castle, destroyed in 1820.
- The war memorial.

== See also ==
- Communes of the Pas-de-Calais department
