= The Spectator (1711) =

Daily publication in England, 1711 to 1712

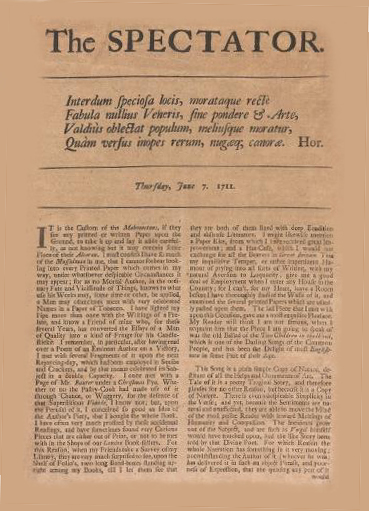
- The Spectator from 7 June 1711
- Frequency: 1711–1712: daily; 1714: three times weekly
- Paid circulation: 3,000
- Founder: Joseph Addison; Richard Steele
- First issue: 1 March 1711; 315 years ago
- Final issue Number: 635
- Country: England
- Language: English

The Spectator was a daily publication published by Joseph Addison and Richard Steele in London, England, from 1711 to 1712. Each "paper", or "number", was approximately 2,500 words long, and often featured an essay or letters on politics or the arts. They were read by many thousands of people, both in England and abroad, including many of the American Founding Fathers, including George Washington.

The original run consisted of 555 numbers, beginning on 1 March 1711. These were collected into seven volumes. The paper was revived without the involvement of Steele in 1714, appearing three times a week for six months, and these papers when collected formed the eighth volume. Eustace Budgell, a cousin of Addison's, and the poet John Hughes also contributed to the publication.

Run	Editors	Numbers	Dates	Frequency	Collected edition
Original	Addison & Steele	1–555	1 Mar 1711 – 6 Dec 1712	Daily (except Sundays)	Vols. I–VII
Revival	Addison	556–635	18 Jun 1714 – 20 Dec 1714	3 times/wk	Vol. VIII

== Aims ==
In Number 10, Mr. Spectator states that The Spectator will aim "to enliven morality with wit, and to temper wit with morality". The journal reached an audience of thousands of people every day, because "the Spectators was something that every middle-class household with aspirations to looking like its members took literature seriously would want to have." He hopes it will be said he has "brought philosophy out of closets and libraries, schools, and colleges, to dwell in clubs and assemblies, at tea-tables and coffee–houses". Women were a target audience for The Spectator, because one of the aims of the periodical was to increase the number of women who were "of a more elevated life and conversation." Steele states in The Spectator, No. 10, "But there are none to whom this paper will be more useful than to the female world." He recommends that readers of the paper consider it "as a part of the tea-equipage" and set aside time to read it each morning. The Spectator sought to provide readers with topics for well-reasoned discussion, and to equip them to carry on conversations and engage in social interactions in a polite manner. In keeping with the values of Enlightenment philosophies of their time, the authors of The Spectator promoted family, marriage, and courtesy.

The Spectator published letters and essays purporting to be observations of a "spectator" of the London coffee house scene. Topics included a wide range of politics, foreign affairs, the theater, arts, literature, poetry, and love, often presented with a humorous tone.

== Readership ==
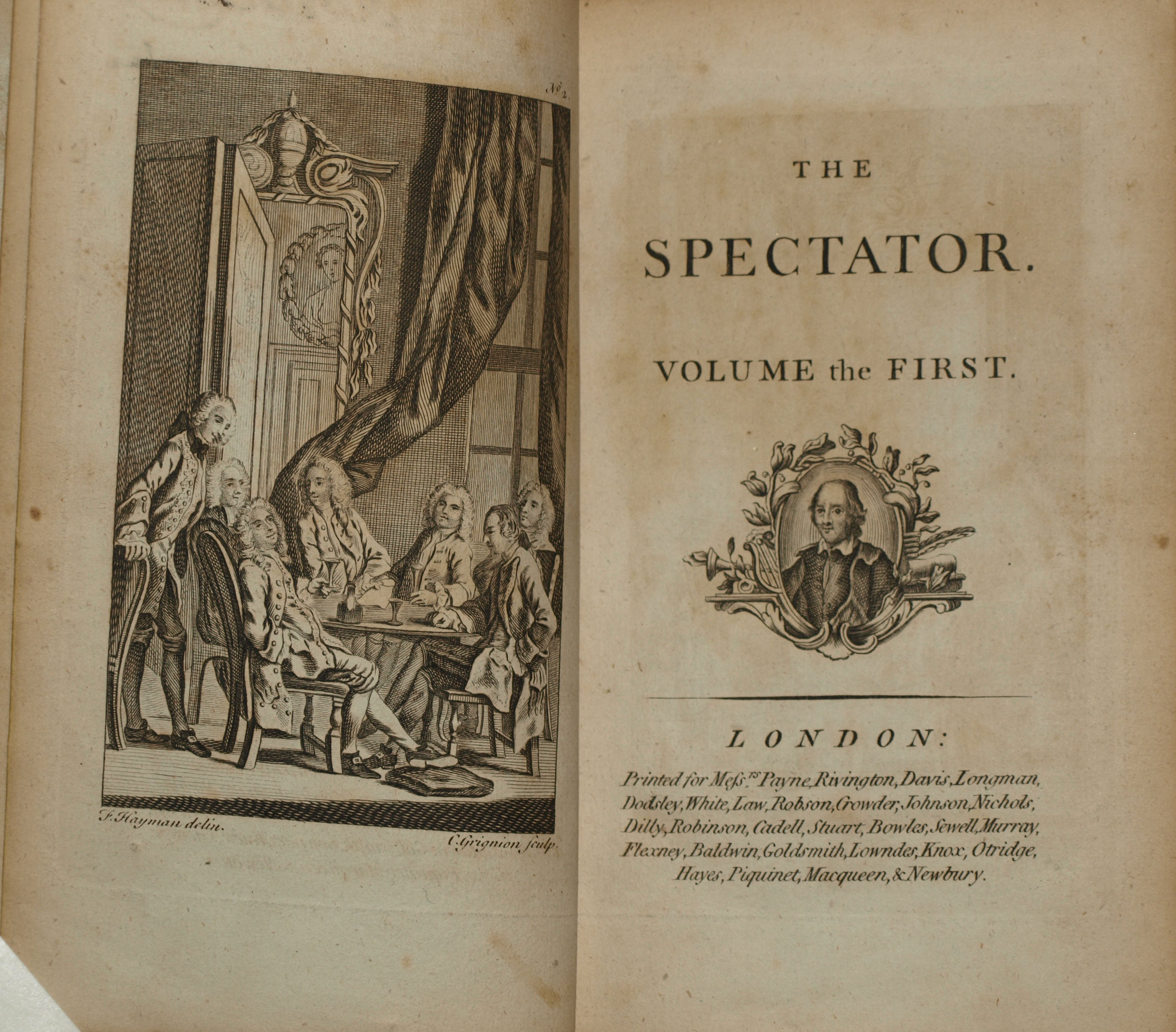
Title pages of the c. 1788 edition of the collected edition of Addison and Steele's The Spectator

Despite a modest daily circulation of approximately 3,000 copies, The Spectator was widely read; Joseph Addison estimated that each number was read by thousands of Londoners, about a tenth of the capital's population at the time. Contemporary historians and literary scholars, meanwhile, do not consider this to be an unreasonable claim; most readers were not themselves subscribers but patrons of one of the subscribing coffeehouses. These readers came from many stations in society, but the paper catered principally to the interests of England's emerging middle class—merchants and traders large and small.

The Spectator also had many readers in the American colonies. In particular, James Madison read the paper avidly as a teenager. It is said to have had a big influence on his world view, lasting throughout his long life. Benjamin Franklin was also a reader, and the Spectator influenced his style in his "Silence Dogood" letters.

Jürgen Habermas sees The Spectator as instrumental in the formation of the public sphere in 18th century England. Although The Spectator declares itself to be politically neutral, it was widely recognised as promoting Whig values and interests.

The Spectator continued to be popular and widely read in the late 18th and 19th centuries. It was sold in eight-volume editions. Its prose style, and its marriage of morality and advice with entertainment, were considered exemplary. The decline in its popularity has been discussed by Brian McCrea and C. S. Lewis.

== Notable essays ==
=== Inkle and Yarico ===
In The Spectator, No.11, Steele created a frame narrative that would come to be a very well known story in the eighteenth century, the story of Inkle and Yarico. Although the periodical essay was published on 13 March 1711, the story is based on Richard Ligon's publication in 1647. Ligon's publication, A True and Exact History of the Island of Barbadoes, reports on how the cruelties of the transatlantic slave trade contribute to slave-produced goods such as tobacco and sugarcane. Mr. Spectator goes to speak with an older woman, Arietta, whom many people visit to discuss various topics. When Mr. Spectator enters the room, there is already another man present speaking with Arietta. They are discussing "constancy in love," and the man uses the tale of The Ephesian Matron to support his point. Arietta is insulted and angered by the man's hypocrisy and sexism. She counters his tale with one of her own, the story of Inkle and Yarico. Thomas Inkle, a twenty-year-old man from London, sailed to the West Indies to increase his wealth through trade. While on an island, he encounters a group of Indians, who battle and kill many of his shipmates. After fleeing, Inkle hides in a cave where he discovers Yarico, an Indian maiden. They become enamored with one another's clothing and physical appearances, and Yarico for the next several months hides her lover from her people and provides him with food and fresh water. Eventually, a ship passes, headed for Barbadoes, and Inkle and Yarico use this opportunity to leave the island. After reaching the English colony, Inkle sells Yarico to a merchant, even after she tells him that she is pregnant. Arietta closes the tale stating that Inkle simply uses Yarico's declaration to argue for a higher price when selling her. Mr. Spectator is so moved by the story that he takes his leave. Steele's text was so well known and influential that seven decades after his publication, George Colman modified the short story into a comic opera, Inkle and Yarico.

== Editions ==
- The standard edition of The Spectator is Donald F. Bond's edition in five volumes, published in 1965. Selections can be found in The Norton Anthology of English Literature.
- Ross, Angus (ed.) Selections from The Tatler and The Spectator (Harmondsworth: Penguin, 1982) ISBN 0-14-043-130-6. Edited with an introduction and notes. Out of print.

== See also ==
- Bully Dawson, mentioned in The Spectator as being kicked by "Sir Roger de Coverley" in a public coffee house
- The Spectator, a current weekly British conservative magazine, which borrows its name from the 1711 publication
