= Auchy-les-Mines =

- Commune
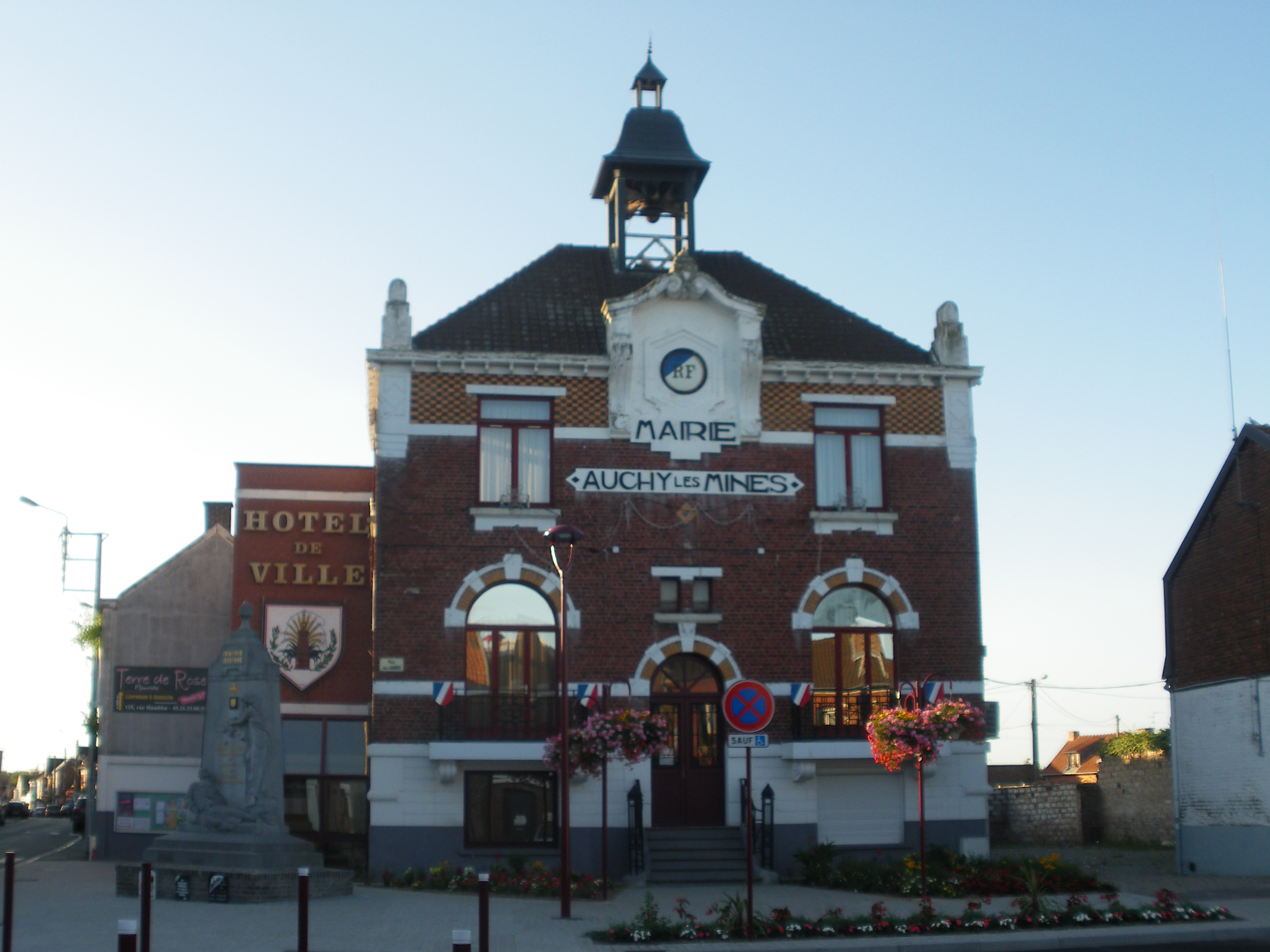
- The town hall of Auchy-les-Mines

- Coat of arms
- Location of Auchy-les-Mines
- Location within France Location within Hauts-de-France
- Coordinates: 50°30′46″N 2°47′05″E
- Country: France
- Region: Hauts-de-France
- Department: Pas-de-Calais
- Arrondissement: Béthune
- Canton: Douvrin
- Intercommunality: CA Béthune-Bruay, Artois-Lys Romane

Government
  - Mayor (2020–2026): Jean Michel Legrand
- Area^{1}: 5.1 km^{2} (2.0 sq mi)
- Elevation: 26 m (85 ft)
- Highest elevation: 37 m (121 ft)
- Lowest elevation: 23 m (75 ft)
- Population (2023): 4,625
  - Density: 910/km^{2} (2,300/sq mi)
- Time zone: UTC+01:00 (CET)
  - Summer (DST): UTC+02:00 (CEST)
- INSEE/Postal code: 62051 /62138
- ^{1} French Land Register data, which excludes lakes, ponds, glaciers > 1 km^{2} (0.386 sq mi or 247 acres) and river estuaries.

Auchy-les-Mines (French pronunciation: [oʃi le min]) is a commune in the Pas-de-Calais department in the Hauts-de-France region of France. Until 1926 it was named Auchy-lez-La-Bassée.

== Geography ==
A small ex-coal mining town, now mostly a light engineering and farming commune, situated 6 miles (9.7 km) east of Béthune and 12 miles (19 km) southwest of Lille, at the junction of the N41 and the D163 roads.

== Coal mining ==
Work on Mine 8 at Auchy-les-Mines began by the Compagnie des mines de Béthune in July 1891, and the mine was opened in November 1893. Shaft 8bis was started in November 1893.

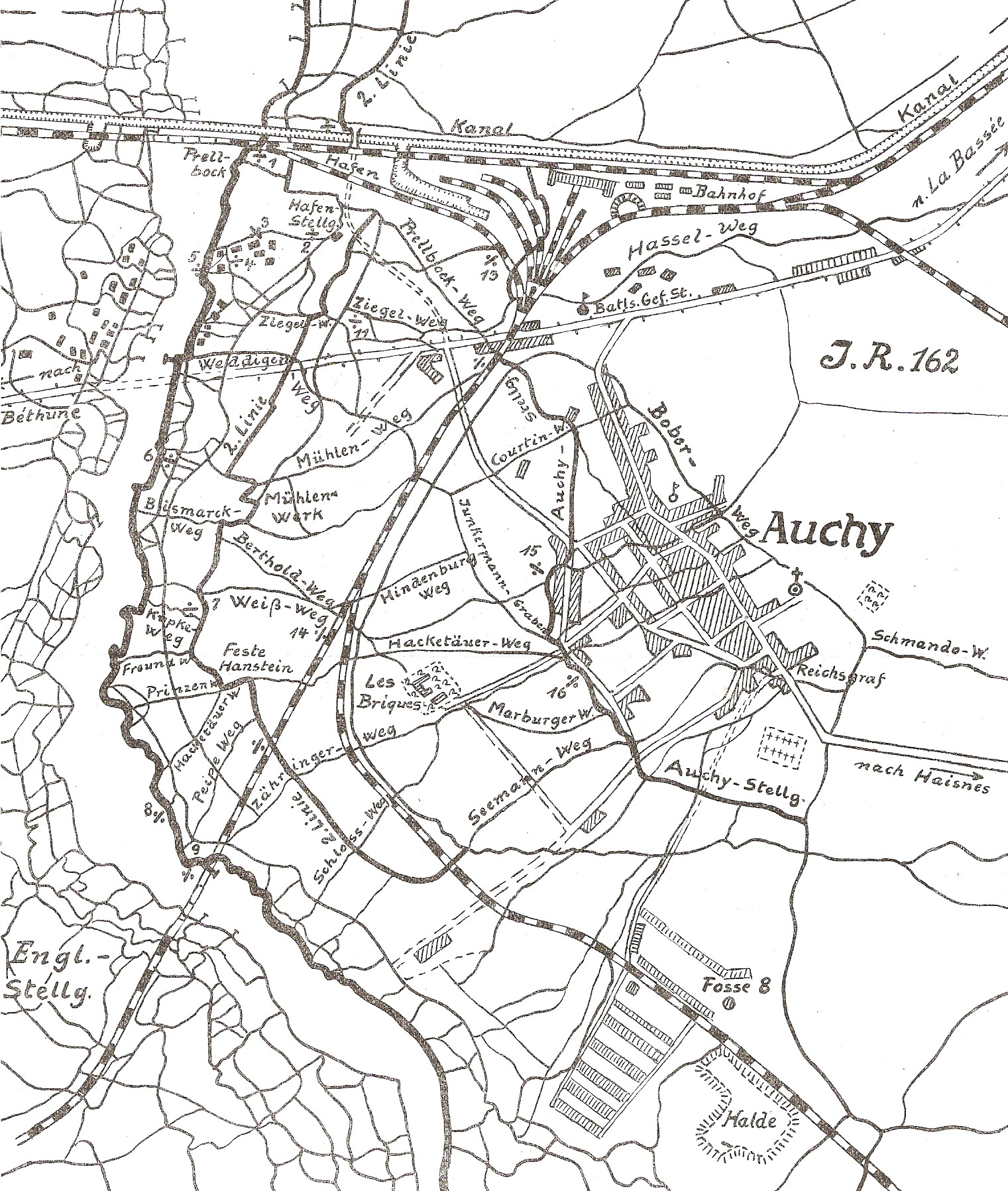
in 1916

During World War I (1914–18) the front stabilized in the autumn of 1914 and a war of position began. The Mines de Béthune concession was cut in two along a line from Auchy-les-Mines to Liévin, with Mines 4 and 8 occupied by the Germans. Mine 4 (Vermelles) was recovered in December 1914, but Mine 8 (Auchy) was not recovered until the German troops withdrew at the end of the war. A long gallery led from the main Mines de Béthune concession to Mine 8 in Auchy in the northeast. Shaft 8 was blocked by the Germans between the 240 metres (790 ft) level and the lower level, but below the blockage the French could freely work the coal seams, even under the German side. Pumps were brought back into service below the shafts to drain the sector.

British soldiers of the 170th Tunneling Company established a listening system at the bottom of shaft 8bis which picked up sounds of activity in August 1917. In early September there was an underground struggle in which the Germans were forced out of the mine. Around midnight of 25–26 September 1917 the 38th German Pioneer Regiment poured about 8 tons of the suffocating gas chloropicrin into Mine 8, and carried by the ventilation systems the gas took under four hours to travel the 6 kilometres (3.7 mi) to Mine 9 and the shaft of Mine 12. The people around the base of Shaft 8 died, but those further away escaped via the ladders of Shaft 9. After the attack a thick masonry wall was built in the main haulage gallery to isolate the sectors near shafts 8 and 8bis. The Germans blew up the casing of Shaft 8 and the heads of Shafts 8 and 8bis. The mine was reopened after the war, and finally closed in 1961.

== Population ==
Historical population
Year	Pop.	±% p.a.
1968	3,989	—
1975	3,785	−0.75%
1982	3,664	−0.46%
1990	4,076	+1.34%
1999	4,459	+1.00%
2007	4,444	−0.04%
2012	4,621	+0.78%
2017	4,726	+0.45%
2023	4,625	−0.36%
Source: INSEE

== Sights ==
- The church of St. Martin, rebuilt, as was the entire village, after World War I.
- The Hohenzollern Redoubt, a German fortification on the Western Front in World War I.

== See also ==
- Communes of the Pas-de-Calais department

== Sources ==
- Bouguereau, Rémi; Leignel, Valentine; Piernas, Gersende (2008), 1994 026: Houillères du Bassin Nord-pas-de-Calais Mines De Béthune (Pas-de-Calais) (PDF) (in French), Archives Nationales
- Compagnie de Béthune (in French), Association MINING, archived from the original on 31 July 2017
- La compagnie des mines de Béthune pendant la Première Guerre mondiale (in French), Archives du Pas-de-Calais
- Laforgerie, Eric (2013), "Une attaque par gaz dans les mines de Bethune", Les souterrains de la grande guerre (in French), Ysec Editions, ISBN 978-2846731652
