= Bulley (disambiguation) =

Bulley is a hamlet in the Forest of Dean, Gloucestershire, England.

Bulley may also refer to:

== Surname ==
- Arthur Bulley (1861–1942), British cotton merchant and gardener
- Agnes Lois Bulley (1901-1995), British county councillor, political activist and philanthropist
- Cyril Bulley (1907–1989), Church of England bishop
- Frederick Bulley (1810–1885), President of Magdalen College, Oxford, UK
- Nicola Bulley (1977-2023), British woman who disappeared in 2023
- Rebecca Bulley (born 1982), Australian netball player
- Ted Bulley (born 1955), Canadian ice hockey player
- Victoria Adukwei Bulley (fl. 2023), Ghanaian-British poet

== Business ==
- Bulley & Andrews, a building contractor in Chicago

== See also ==
- Bully (disambiguation)
