= Bully (2017 film) =

Musical featurette

- Theatrical release poster
- Directed by: Aaron Alon
- Screenplay by: Aaron Alon
- Cinematography: Orlando Briones
- Edited by: Ely Bams
- Music by: Aaron Alon
- Production company: Thunderclap Productions
- Release dates: September 24, 2017 (Houston, TX, US)
- Running time: 58 minutes
- Country: United States
- Language: English

Bully (alternatively titled Bully: The Musical) is a 2017 musical featurette written and directed by Aaron Alon and produced by Thunderclap Productions. Bully is a dramatic musical about Sam Bradley, a young man who kills himself after being repeatedly bullied in school because others suspect he is gay. The story follows Sam in the days leading up to his death and the lives of those around him in the days following his suicide.

Bully premiered in the United States on September 24, 2017, at Alamo Drafthouse – Mason Park in Houston, Texas. The film had its film festival premiere in the 2018 Rainier Independent Film Festival in Ashford, Washington, on May 20, 2018.

== Synopsis ==
The film tells the story of Sam Bradley, a young man who commits suicide after being bullied in school.

== Cast ==
- Edward Henrickson as Sam Bradley, a 14-year-old being bullied in school
- Danica Dawn Johnson as Mrs. Bradley, Sam's mother
- Brad Goertz as Mr. Bradley, Sam's father
- Kiefer Slaton as Tommy Samson, a bully at Sam's school with an abusive father
- Chelsea Lerner as Mrs. Samson, Tommy's mother
- Steve Hale as Mr. Samson, Tommy's abusive father
- Reggie Choyce as Hunter Sikes, a bully at Sam's school whose parents are prone to violence toward one another
- Monica Davis as Mrs. Sikes, Hunter's mother
- Juan Sebastian Cruz as Chase Cruz, a bully at Sam's school whose mother suffers from an addiction to pain pills
- Amanda Passanante as Mrs. Cruz, Chase's mother
- M.E. Frazier Jr. as Mr. Ross, the school guidance counselor at Sam's high school
- Nora Hahn as Principal Rutledge, the principal at Sam's high school
- Tamara Siler as the First Mourner, the person who starts the vigil for Sam
- Emma Hayden, Ragan Richardson, Michael J. Ross, and Taelon Stonecipher as the quartet in "It Gets Better," four people filming their "It Gets Better" stories in response to Sam's suicide

== Songs ==
1. "When" – performed by Danica Dawn Johnston and Brad Goertz (as Mrs. and Mr. Bradley); lyrics and music by Aaron Alon
2. "The Bullies' Song" – performed by Reggie Choyce, Kiefer Slaton, and Juan Sebastian Cruz (as Hunter, Tommy, and Chase); lyrics and music by Aaron Alon
3. "Hunter's Song" – performed by Reggie Choyce (as Hunter); lyrics and music by Aaron Alon
4. "Start Raising Men" – performed by Steve Hale (as Mr. Samson); lyrics and music by Aaron Alon
5. "It Gets Better" – performed by Emma Hayden, Ragan Richardson, Michael J. Ross, and Taelon Stonecipher (as themselves); lyrics and music by Aaron Alon
6. "Hollow House" – performed by Julian A. Puerto; lyrics and music by Aaron Alon
7. "He's a Child" – performed by Monica Davis and Amanda Passanante (as Mrs. Sikes and Mrs. Cruz); lyrics and music by Aaron Alon
8. "Who's Next" – performed by M.E. Frazier Jr. (as Mr. Ross) with Tristan Smith on jazz guitar; lyrics and music by Aaron Alon
9. "The Bullies' Song - Reprise" – performed by Reggie Choyce, Kiefer Slaton, and Juan Sebastian Cruz (as Hunter, Tommy, and Chase); lyrics and music by Aaron Alon
10. "Raise Your Voice" – performed by Tamara Siler and company (as themselves); lyrics and music by Aaron Alon
11. "Was" – performed by Danica Dawn Johnston (as Mrs. Bradley); lyrics and music by Aaron Alon
12. "The More It Bleeds" – performed by Patrick Barton, Amy Garner Buchanan, William Sanders, Karen Schlag, Haley Simpson, and company (as themselves); lyrics and music by Aaron Alon
13. "Did He Think" – performed by Brad Goertz (as Mr. Bradley); lyrics and music by Aaron Alon

== Release ==
Bully premiered in the United States on September 24, 2017, at Alamo Drafthouse – Mason Park in Houston. The second screening occurred April 10, 2018, at the University of Houston. The film had its film festival premiere in the 2018 Rainier Independent Film Festival in Ashford, Washington on May 20, 2018.

=== Official selections ===
Bully has been selected for screening at the following festivals and events:

- Cinema Diverse: the Palm Springs Gay and Lesbian Film Festival (2018)
- Cult Critic Movie Awards (2018)
- Depth of Field International Film Festival (2018)
- Eurasia International Monthly Film Festival (2018)
- Filmfest Homochrom (2018)
- Five Continents International Film Festival (2018)
- Fort Worth Indie Film Showcase (2018)
- IndieFest (2018)
- Indigo Moon Film Festival (2018)
- Lake View International Film Festival (2018)
- Los Angeles Underground Film Forum (2018)
- Next International Film Festival – NiFF Houston (2018)
- Out of the Can Film Festival (2018)
- PUSH! Film Festival (2018)
- South Carolina Underground Film Festival (2018)
- Queer Hippo International LGBT Film Festival (2018)
- Rainer Independent Film Festival (2018)
- Thessaloniki International LGBTIQ Film Festival (2018)
- TMFF – The Monthly Film Festival (March–April 2018)
- UK Monthly Film Festival (2018)

=== Awards and nominations ===
Year	Award	Category	Nominee(s)	Result
2018	AltFF Alternative Film Festival	Best Feature Drama	Bully	Won
2018	AltFF Alternative Film Festival	Best Actor	Edward Henrickson	Nominated
2018	AltFF Alternative Film Festival	Best Cinematography	Orlando Briones	Nominated
2018	Cinema Diverse	Festival Favorite	Bully	Won
2018	Depth of Field International Film Festival	Best of Show	Bully	Won
2018	Eurasia International Monthly Film Festival	Best Director	Aaron Alon	Won
2018	Five Continents International Film Festival	Best Fiction Half-Length Film	Bully	Won
2018	Five Continents International Film Festival	Best Original Music	Aaron Alon	Won
2018	Five Continents International Film Festival	Best Young Actor in a Feature Film	Edward Henrickson	Won
2018	Five Continents International Film Festival	Best Poster	Bully	Nominated
2018	Fort Worth Indie Film Showcase	Best Overall Domestic Featurette	Bully	Won
2018	Fort Worth Indie Film Showcase	Genre Award: Domestic Awareness	Bully	Nominated
2018	The IndieFEST Film Awards	Award of Merit, LGBT	Bully	Won
2018	International Independent Film Awards	Gold Winner: Best Song	"Hollow House"	Won
2018	Lake View International Film Festival	Best LGBT Film of the Month (June)	Bully	Won
2018	Los Angeles Underground Film Forum	Best Picture	Bully	Won
2018	Los Angeles Underground Film Forum	Best First Feature	Bully	Won
2018	Los Angeles Underground Film Forum	Best Narrative Feature	Bully	Won
2018	Los Angeles Underground Film Forum	Best LGBT Film	Bully	Won
2018	Los Angeles Underground Film Forum	Best Underground Feature	Bully	Won
2018	Next International Film Festival - NIFF Houston	Best of Houston	Bully	Won
2018	Out of the Can Film Festival	Best Comedy or Musical	Bully	Runner-Up
2018	Out of the Can Film Festival	Best First Time Director	Aaron Alon	Nominee

== Funding ==
The film received grants from the Houston Art Alliance, the John Steven Kellett Foundation, the City of Houston, and donations from over fifty individuals.

== See also ==
- Suicide prevention
- Education in the United States
