= Grenay, Pas-de-Calais =

Grenay
- Commune
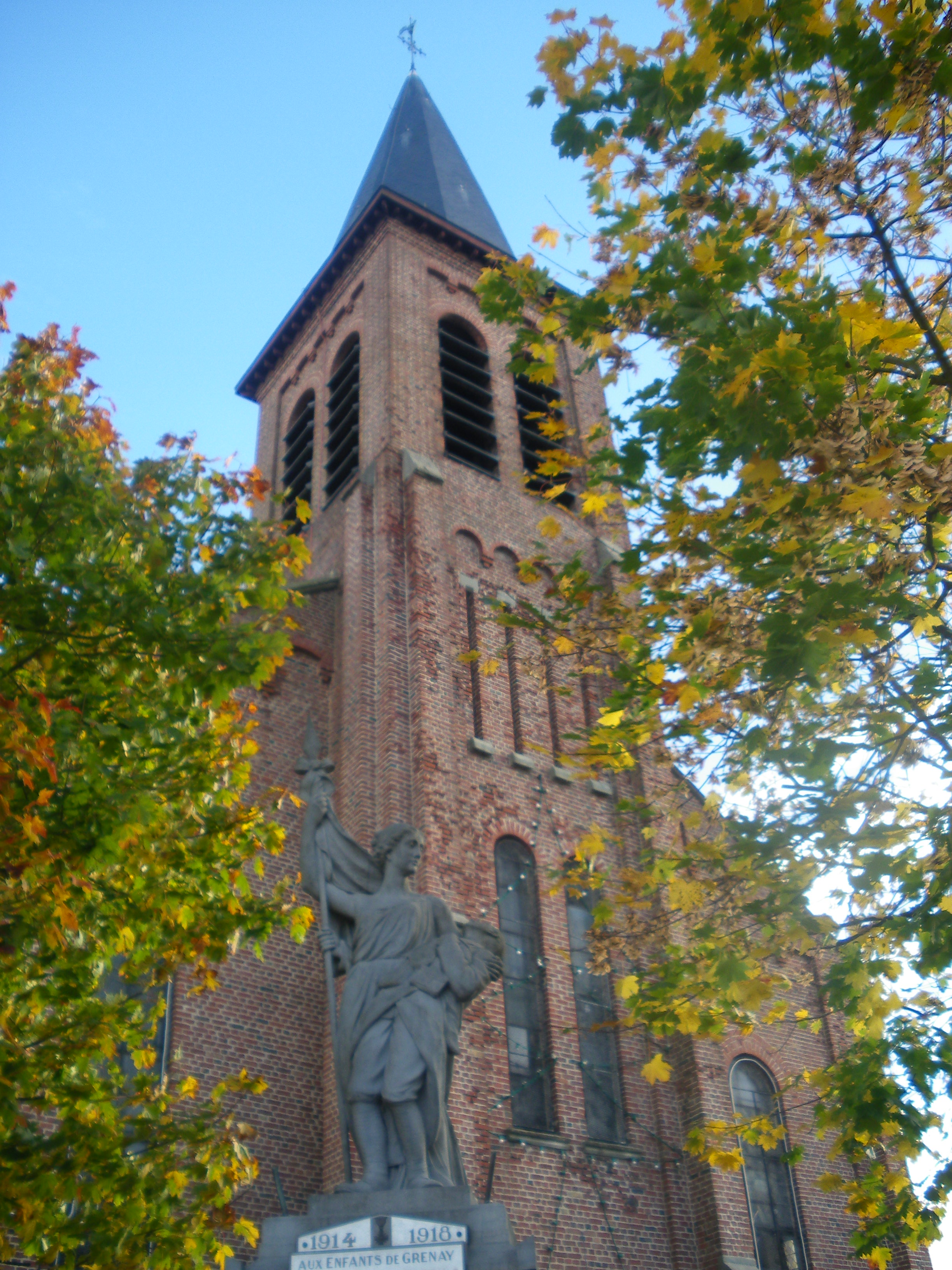
- The church of Grenay

- Coat of arms
- Location of Grenay
- Location within France Location within Hauts-de-France
- Coordinates: 50°27′10″N 2°44′38″E
- Country: France
- Region: Hauts-de-France
- Department: Pas-de-Calais
- Arrondissement: Lens
- Canton: Wingles
- Intercommunality: CA Lens-Liévin

Government
  - Mayor (2023–2026): Christelle Buissette
- Area^{1}: 3.22 km^{2} (1.24 sq mi)
- Elevation: 60 m (200 ft)
- Highest elevation: 80 m (260 ft)
- Lowest elevation: 48 m (157 ft)
- Population (2023): 6,644
  - Density: 2,060/km^{2} (5,340/sq mi)
- Time zone: UTC+01:00 (CET)
  - Summer (DST): UTC+02:00 (CEST)
- INSEE/Postal code: 62386 /62160
- ^{1} French Land Register data, which excludes lakes, ponds, glaciers > 1 km^{2} (0.386 sq mi or 247 acres) and river estuaries.

Grenay (French pronunciation: [ɡʁənɛ]; Picard: Guernay) is a commune in the Pas-de-Calais department in the Hauts-de-France region of France. It is part of the arrondissement of Lens, the canton of Wingles and the Communaupole de Lens-Liévin. The current mayor is Christelle Buissette, elected in 2023.

== Geography ==
An ex-coalmining and light industrial town situated some 5 miles (8.0 km) northwest of Lens, at the junction of the D165 and the D58.

== Coal mining ==
Excavation of the 640 metres (2,100 ft) Mine 11 at Grenay by the Compagnie des mines de Béthune began in October 1904. Excavation of the 749 metres (2,457 ft) Shaft 11bis, for ventilation, began in May 1906. Extraction started in April 1908. The shafts were back-filled in 1967 and the surface installions destroyed in 1969.

== Population ==
Historical population
Year	Pop.	±% p.a.
1968	8,063	—
1975	6,902	−2.20%
1982	5,875	−2.28%
1990	6,213	+0.70%
1999	6,395	+0.32%
2007	6,548	+0.30%
2012	6,855	+0.92%
2017	6,932	+0.22%
2023	6,644	−0.70%
Source: INSEE

== Places of interest ==
- The church of Notre-Dame, dating from the 18th century.
- The church of St.Louise, dating from the 20th century.
- The war memorial and the CWGC graves.

== Twin town ==
- (Republic of Ireland) Ballyshannon, County Donegal, Ireland
- Ruddington, Nottinghamshire, United Kingdom

== See also ==
- Communes of the Pas-de-Calais department
