= Bully Dawson =

17th-century English gambler

Bully Dawson was a notorious gambler from London, England, in the time of Charles II. His name became a byword for a swaggering fool. His character is summed up by Charles Lamb: "Bully Dawson kicked by half the town, and half the town kicked by Bully Dawson".

He is said to have come from either Blackfriars or Whitefriars and little is known of him other than he was a gambler and "sharper". He may have been a punch brewer. Some idea of his reputation can be gleaned from the various works of literature that mention him. In Goldsmith's She Stoops to Conquer, Hardcastle refers to him in Act 3: "And can you be serious? I never saw such a bouncing, swaggering puppy since I was born. Bully Dawson was but a fool to him."

He appears in one of Joe Miller's Jests:

Bully Dawson was overturned in a Hackney-Coach once, pretty near his Lodgings, and being got on his Legs again, he said, ’Twas the greatest Piece of Providence that ever befel him, for it had saved him the Trouble of bilking the Coachman.

He is reputed to be the model for Captain Hackhum in Thomas Shadwell's The Squire of Alsatia.

Sir Roger de Coverley is mentioned in The Spectator No. 2 as having "kicked" him in a public coffee house for being called "youngster", and he is noted in The Newgate Calendar as having been robbed by Davy Morgan after having some success at the gaming table. Morgan, observing Dawson had won a great deal of money, asked to speak to him outside where he proceeded to rob Dawson of 18 guineas at gun point before tying him up and making off.
