= The Bully: A Discussion and Activity Story =

Book by Rita Y. Toews

- Author: Rita Y. Toews
- Illustrator: Jon Ljungberg
- Language: English
- Genre: Children's
- Publication date: 2003
- Publication place: United States
- Pages: 40 pp
- ISBN: 978-0-9736224-0-9

The Bully: A Discussion and Activity Story is a 40-page children's story and activity book by Rita Y. Toews published in 2003. The story focuses on giving children a voice as to how bullying makes them feel, and educates parents on how to handle a bully situation in a positive manner. The book can be used in a classroom, one-on-one with a counsellor or with a parent/caregiver.

== Plot summary ==
Jason is bullied at school by a child who demands his lunch every day. His mother is informed by the school that he is often hungry and realizes he is being bullied. She advises Jason they will have to take the problem to the school for help. Jason resists. His mother reminds Jason that if the bully isn't stopped he will continue to bully.

== Book layout ==
The story is followed by a question and answer section for children. The questions help children express their feelings about bullies, and the answers provide practical ways to deal with the problem. The illustrations for the story can be used as a colouring book while the subject of bullying is discussed.

The adult's section of The Bully contains a question and answer portion that informs parents and caregivers about bullying. It also gives effective information for dealing with a bully in a manner that provides a positive role model for children, as well as providing additional resources.

== Editions ==
- ISBN 0-9736224-0-7 (first printing, 2003)
- ISBN 978-0-9736224-0-9 (second printing, 2005)

== See also ==
- Bullying
