= Vermelles =

- Commune
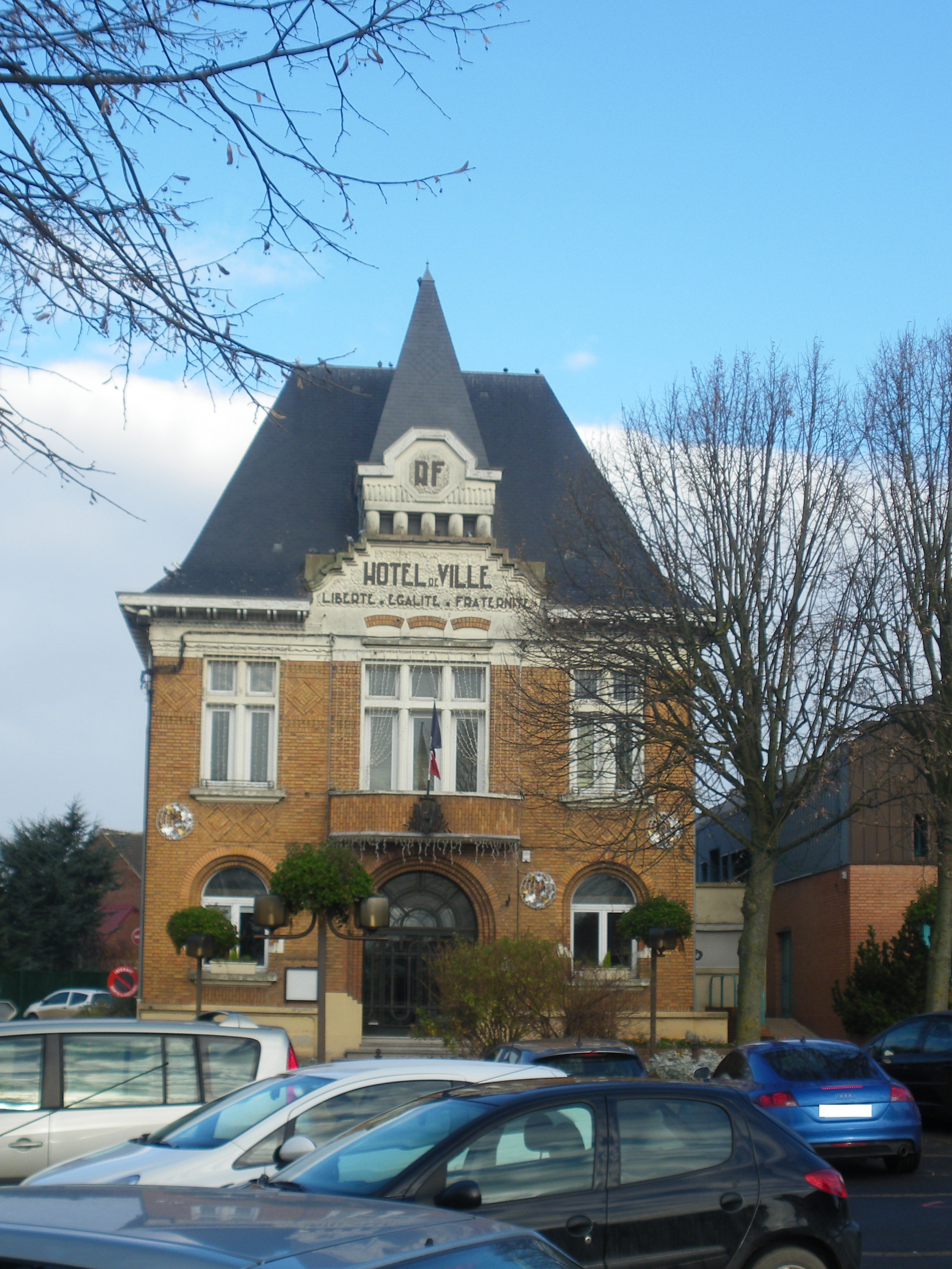
- The town hall of Vermelles

- Coat of arms
- Location of Vermelles
- Location within France Location within Hauts-de-France
- Coordinates: 50°29′20″N 2°44′48″E
- Country: France
- Region: Hauts-de-France
- Department: Pas-de-Calais
- Arrondissement: Béthune
- Canton: Douvrin
- Intercommunality: CA Béthune-Bruay, Artois-Lys Romane

Government
  - Mayor (2020–2026): Alain de Carrion
- Area^{1}: 10.39 km^{2} (4.01 sq mi)
- Elevation: 43 m (141 ft)
- Highest elevation: 50 m (160 ft)
- Lowest elevation: 23 m (75 ft)
- Population (2023): 4,729
  - Density: 455.1/km^{2} (1,179/sq mi)
- Time zone: UTC+01:00 (CET)
  - Summer (DST): UTC+02:00 (CEST)
- INSEE/Postal code: 62846 /62980
- ^{1} French Land Register data, which excludes lakes, ponds, glaciers > 1 km^{2} (0.386 sq mi or 247 acres) and river estuaries.

Vermelles (French pronunciation: [vɛʁmɛl]) is a commune in the Pas-de-Calais department in the Hauts-de-France region of France.

== Geography ==
Vermelles is situated 6 miles (9.7 km) southeast of Béthune and 20 miles (32 km) southwest of Lille, at the junction of the D39, D75 and D943 roads and by the banks of the river Surgeon.

== Coal mining ==
Vermelles was the second extraction site used by the Compagnie des mines de Béthune. Excavation of Mine 3 in Vermelles began in January 1857, reaching a rugged, steeply inclined deposit of coal at 147 metres (482 ft). Extraction started in July 1860. Air compressors were installed in Mine 3 1877. This proved the company's most productive mine, with a total of 1,525,000 tons. Excavation of Mine 4 at Vermelles started in October 1865 and reached coal at 149 metres (489 ft). Extraction started in 1867. Mine 4 was abandoned in 1876 because the very irregular deposit at 250 metres (820 ft) seemed unusable. There was a lot of firedamp compared to other mines. Mine 4 was reopened and extraction resumed at 387 metres (1,270 ft) in 1911. The main shaft reached 389 metres (1,276 ft).

During World War I (1914–18) the Germans were stopped just to the east of Vermelles. Mine 4 was recovered in December 1914. Barricades were built as early as 1916 along the main axes of the mine complex so it could be defended while allowing ventilation and the passage of men. Mines 3 and 4 in Vermelles were isolated from the rest of the mines by watertight doors. After the war, Shaft 4bis was opened to the north of Shaft 4 in 1925 for ventilation, 301 metres (988 ft) deep. Mine 4 was closed in 1965, and Mine 3 was closed in 1977.

== Population ==
Historical population
Year	Pop.	±% p.a.
1968	4,518	—
1975	4,299	−0.71%
1982	4,339	+0.13%
1990	4,584	+0.69%
1999	4,487	−0.24%
2007	4,308	−0.51%
2012	4,518	+0.96%
2017	4,726	+0.90%
2023	4,729	+0.01%
Source: INSEE

== Places of interest ==
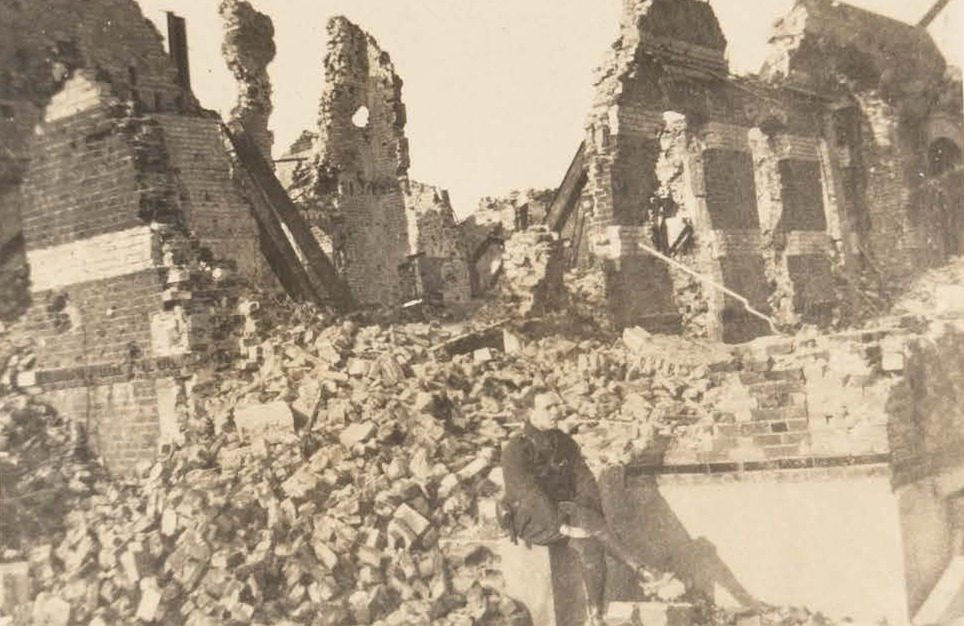
The Château de Vermelles, destroyed on 30 December 1914

- The church of St. Pierre, rebuilt, along with most of the village, after the First World War.
- The war memorials.
- The modern church of Notre-Dame.
- The Commonwealth War Graves Commission cemeteries.

== Twin town ==
- Glauchau, in Germany.

== See also ==
- Communes of the Pas-de-Calais department

== Sources ==
- Compagnie de Béthune (in French), Association MINING, archived from the original on 31 July 2017
- La compagnie des mines de Béthune pendant la Première Guerre mondiale (in French), Archives du Pas-de-Calais
- Laforgerie, Eric (2013), "Une attaque par gaz dans les mines de Bethune", Les souterrains de la grande guerre (in French), Ysec Editions, ISBN 978-2846731652
