= Richebourg, Pas-de-Calais =

Richebourg
- Commune
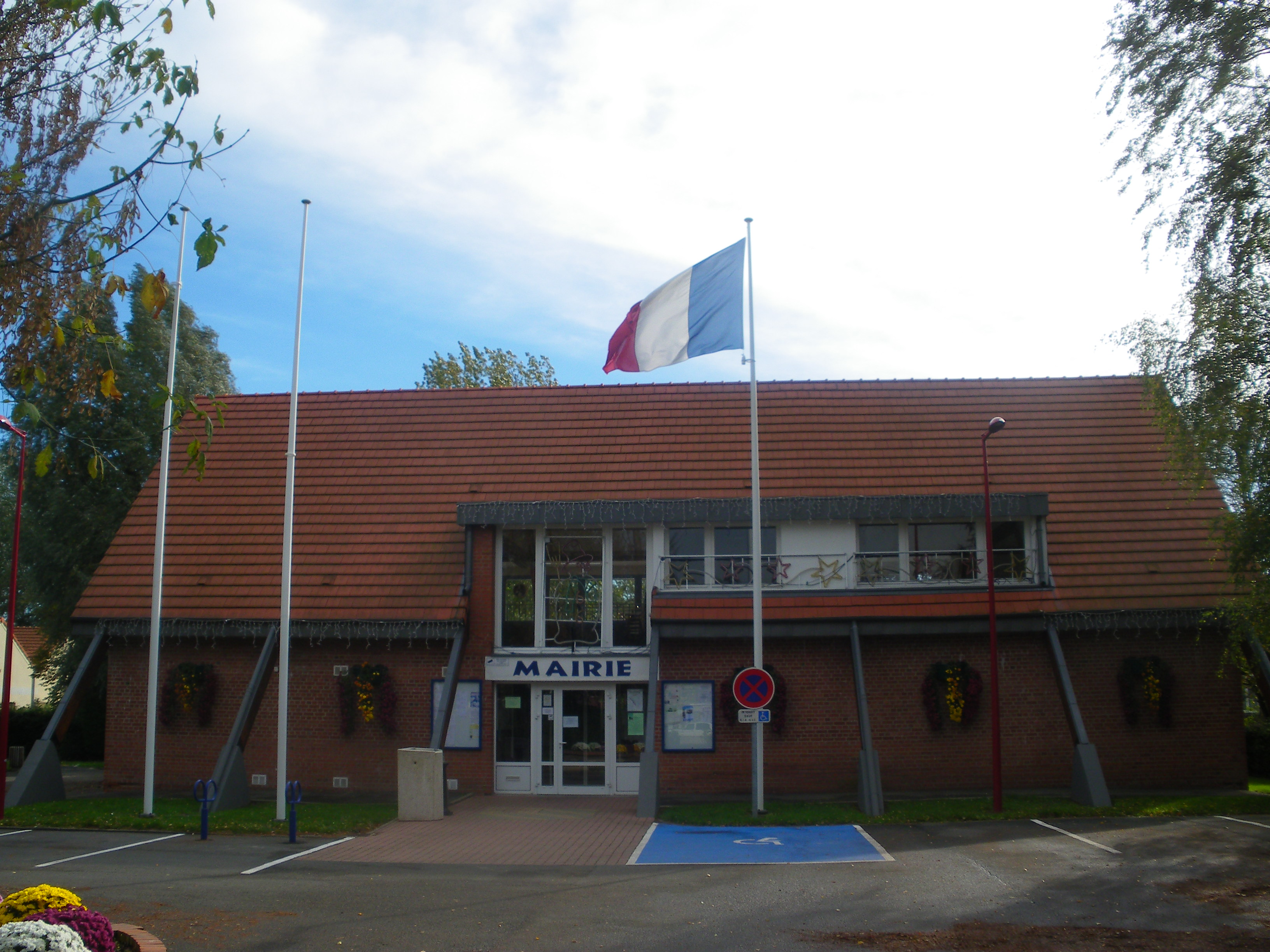
- The town hall of Richebourg

- Coat of arms
- Location of Richebourg
- Location within France Location within Hauts-de-France
- Coordinates: 50°34′47″N 2°44′25″E
- Country: France
- Region: Hauts-de-France
- Department: Pas-de-Calais
- Arrondissement: Béthune
- Canton: Beuvry
- Intercommunality: CA Béthune-Bruay, Artois-Lys Romane

Government
  - Mayor (2020–2026): Jérôme Demulier
- Area^{1}: 17.31 km^{2} (6.68 sq mi)
- Elevation: 19 m (62 ft)
- Highest elevation: 20 m (66 ft)
- Lowest elevation: 16 m (52 ft)
- Population (2023): 2,687
  - Density: 155.2/km^{2} (402.0/sq mi)
- Time zone: UTC+01:00 (CET)
  - Summer (DST): UTC+02:00 (CEST)
- INSEE/Postal code: 62706 /62136
- ^{1} French Land Register data, which excludes lakes, ponds, glaciers > 1 km^{2} (0.386 sq mi or 247 acres) and river estuaries.

Richebourg (French pronunciation: [ʁiʃbuʁ]; Picard: Ricquebourq) is a commune in the Pas-de-Calais department in northern France. It was formed on 21 February 1971 by merging Richebourg-Saint-Vaast and Richebourg-l'Avoué. In 1916, it was the site of the Battle of the Boar's Head.

== Bordering communes ==
- Arrondissement of Béthune:
  - Festubert
  - La Couture
  - Vieille-Chapelle
  - Violaines
  - Laventie
  - Lorgies
  - Neuve-Chapelle
  - Lestrem
- Arrondissement of Dunkerque (Nord department:
  - La Gorgue

== Population ==
Historical population
Year	Pop.	±% p.a.
1968	1,631	—
1975	1,619	−0.11%
1982	2,006	+3.11%
1990	2,463	+2.60%
1999	2,484	+0.09%
2007	2,404	−0.41%
2012	2,510	+0.87%
2017	2,622	+0.88%
2023	2,687	+0.41%
Source: INSEE

== See also ==
- Communes of the Pas-de-Calais department
