= Safilin =

French yarn and fiber mill

Safilin (meaning Salmon Filature de Lin) is a French company specializing in linen and hemp spinning. Founded in 1778 in Armentières (Hauts-de-France) by the Salmon family, the company did not take its current name of Safilin until 1986. Headquartered in Sailly-sur-la-Lys, the company has mainly relocated its production in Poland.

== History ==
The company was founded in 1778 in Armentières by Auguste Salmon. It will be confirmed by a Royal Patent in 1786, thus consecrating it as a manufacturer of linen fabrics and worked binding. Flax was grown and bought on the farm in Flanders, then processed in Sailly-sur-la-Lys. In 1860, the first spinning and weaving factory is created in the hamlet of Bac-Saint-Maur. The company participated in the development of the hamlet. Having bought up various spinning mills in the surrounding area, the enterprise counted up to 800 workers at the beginning of the 20th century. In 1914, it had 4 factories: a linen spinning mill in Bac-Saint-Maur and 3 linen weaving mills, 2 of which were in Bac-Saint-Maur and one in Armentières, comprising 11,000 spinning spindles and 715 mechanical looms. Its yarn is sold throughout Europe. However, the company's building did not resist the First World War and had to be rebuilt from scratch. Nonetheless, in 1922, the company was back on track and became the largest linen centre in Europe. Around 1986, the Salmon company took the name Safilin (for "Salmon filature de lin") and developed in France and especially, for weaving, in Poland (creation of spinning mills in 1995 and 1997). Today, the former Safilin brownfield site, with its 25,000 m^{2} of buildings, has been bought by the Etablissement Public Foncier Hauts-de-France. However, the enterprise is now considering the relocation of a spinning mill in the Hauts-de-France region in order to respond to more local demands from the French market. The new spinning mill is planned to open in 2021.

== Production ==
Historically, the company centered on the production of yarn (for clothing and furnishings), strings, and fabrics made out from flax and hemp fibers. In 1995, Safilin opened a new spinning mill in Milakowo, Poland, focusing on dry spinning, more appropriate for 60-and-plus long fibers, and in 1997, it opened another spinning mill in the city of Szczytno, in Poland also, which would focus on wet spinning, particularly appropriate for flax and hemp fibers. While the Polish production addresses demands from the European Union and Japan, the new French spinning mill has been thought to address demands for a local production and transformation. Moreover, the company gradually diversified its production in order to integrate flax and hemp-based composite materials into architecture and engineering. In 2011, it enters the composite market. Today, its market includes such sectors as transport, construction, wind energy, sport (Kairo), furniture (Varian) and music.

Safilin has also developed its sector of activity by now offering services such as educational and marketing support on linen or support for ready-to-wear brands in the eco-responsible and local sourcing of linen products.

== Governance ==
The company is chaired by Mr. Olivier Guillaume, who also chairs the "Salmon Tissus" company, also based in Sailly-sur-la-Lys. Mr. Guillaume is also a member of the board of directors of the "Lin et Chanvre Bio" association, which notably promotes an organic textile.
