= Cambrin =

- Commune
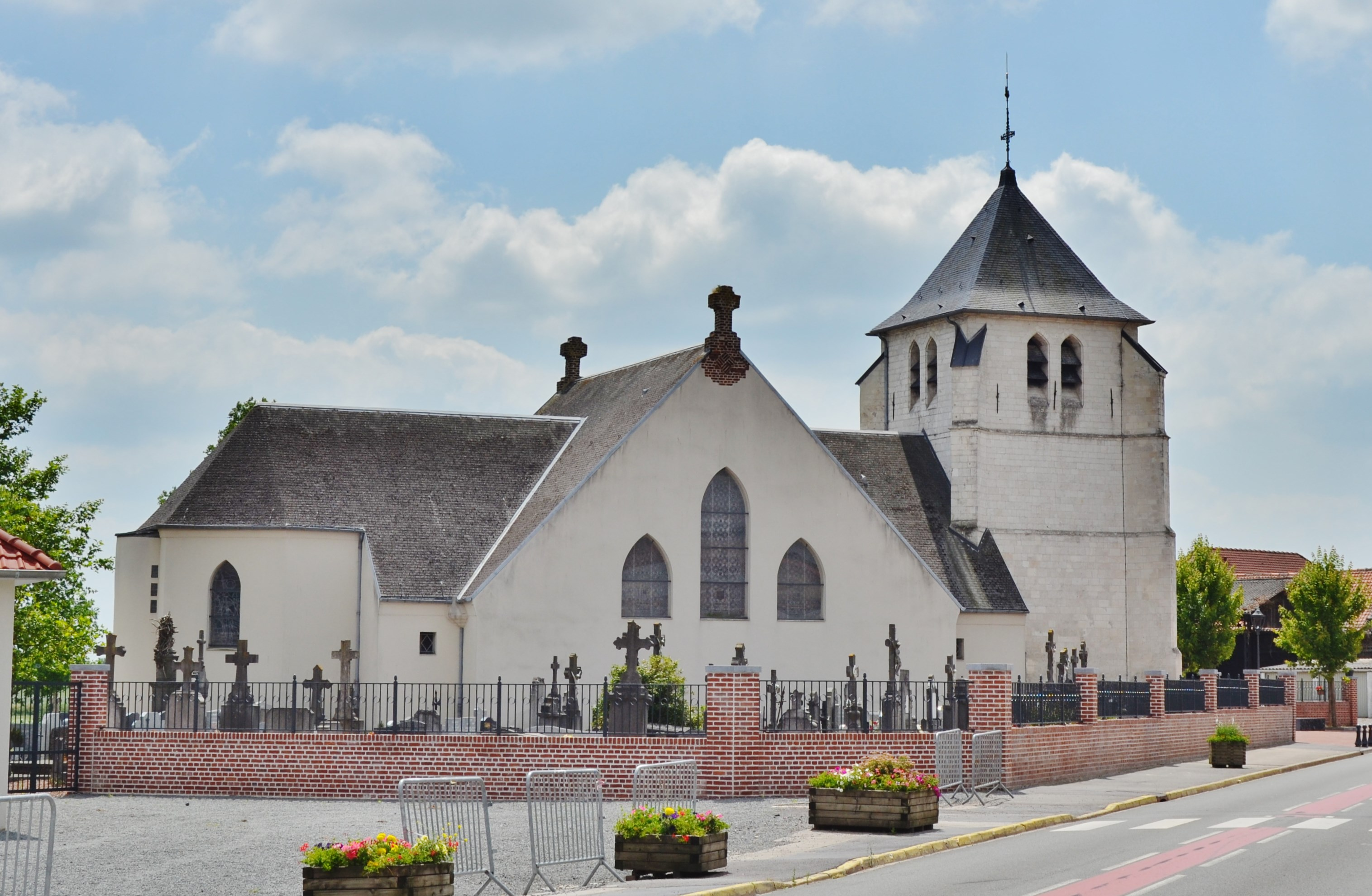
- The church of Cambrin

- Coat of arms
- Location of Cambrin
- Location within France Location within Hauts-de-France
- Coordinates: 50°30′43″N 2°44′36″E
- Country: France
- Region: Hauts-de-France
- Department: Pas-de-Calais
- Arrondissement: Béthune
- Canton: Douvrin
- Intercommunality: CA Béthune-Bruay, Artois-Lys Romane

Government
  - Mayor (2020–2026): Philippe Drumez
- Area^{1}: 1.77 km^{2} (0.68 sq mi)
- Elevation: 30 m (98 ft)
- Highest elevation: 31 m (102 ft)
- Lowest elevation: 19 m (62 ft)
- Population (2023): 1,263
  - Density: 714/km^{2} (1,850/sq mi)
- Time zone: UTC+01:00 (CET)
  - Summer (DST): UTC+02:00 (CEST)
- INSEE/Postal code: 62200 /62149
- ^{1} French Land Register data, which excludes lakes, ponds, glaciers > 1 km^{2} (0.386 sq mi or 247 acres) and river estuaries.

Cambrin (French pronunciation: [kɑ̃bʁɛ̃]) is a commune in the Pas-de-Calais department in the Hauts-de-France region of France about 5 miles (8.0 km) east of Béthune and 18 miles (29 km) southwest of Lille by the banks of the small river Surgeon.

The marshes of Cambrin are an area of ponds and swamps bordering the communes of Cuinchy and Annequin. They cover 22 hectares and are open to the public. This natural space is managed by the Nature Conservatory Sites of Nord and Pas-de-Calais.

== Population ==
Historical population
Year	Pop.	±% p.a.
1968	791	—
1975	814	+0.41%
1982	740	−1.35%
1990	844	+1.66%
1999	957	+1.41%
2007	1,003	+0.59%
2012	977	−0.52%
2017	1,244	+4.95%
2023	1,263	+0.25%
Source: INSEE

== See also ==
- Communes of the Pas-de-Calais department
