= Sailly-Labourse =

- Commune
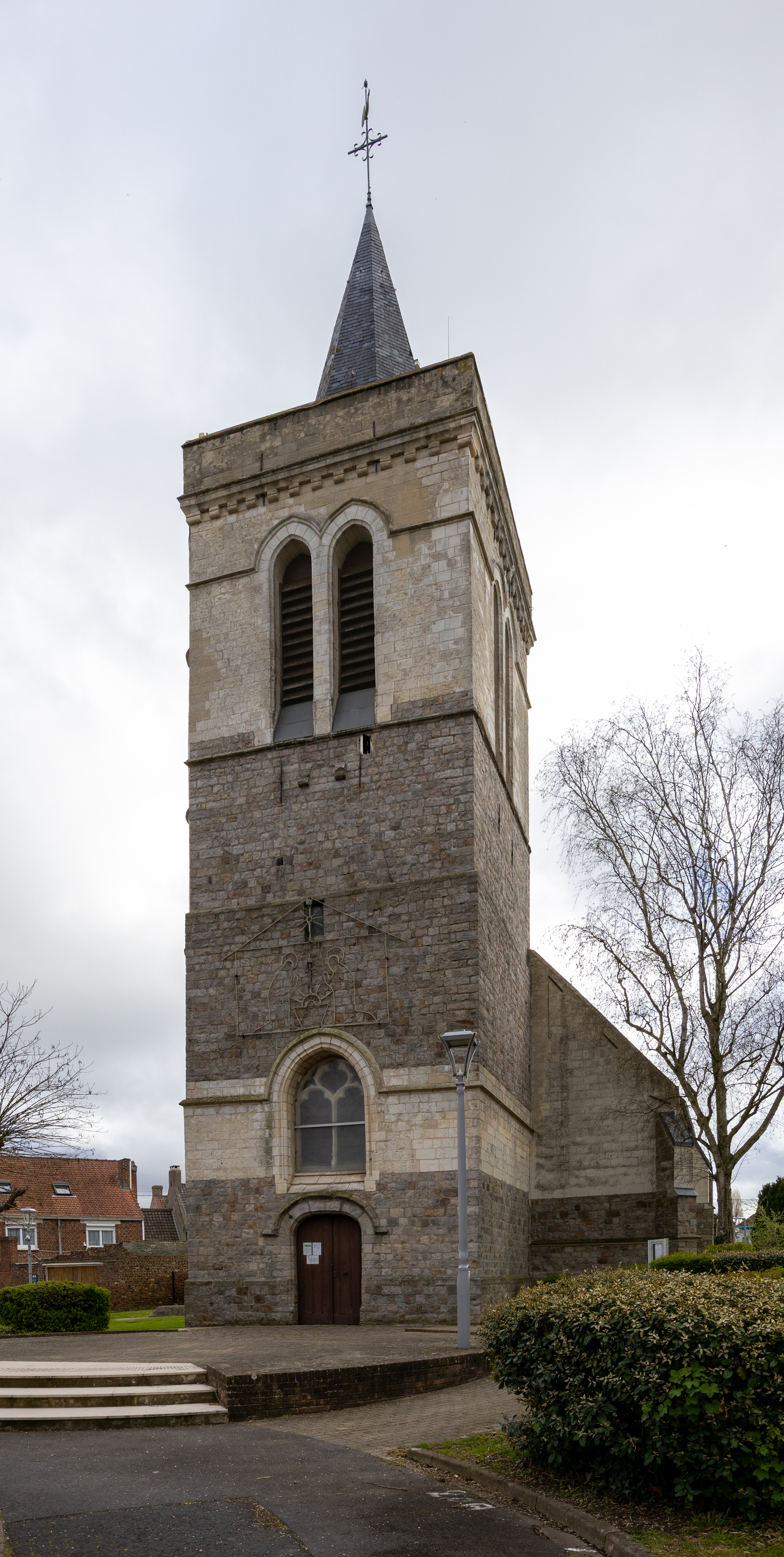
- The church of Sailly-Labourse

- Coat of arms
- Location of Sailly-Labourse
- Location within France Location within Hauts-de-France
- Coordinates: 50°30′09″N 2°41′42″E
- Country: France
- Region: Hauts-de-France
- Department: Pas-de-Calais
- Arrondissement: Béthune
- Canton: Douvrin
- Intercommunality: CA Béthune-Bruay, Artois-Lys Romane

Government
  - Mayor (2020–2026): Dominique Hennebelle
- Area^{1}: 6.02 km^{2} (2.32 sq mi)
- Elevation: 29 m (95 ft)
- Highest elevation: 41 m (135 ft)
- Lowest elevation: 19 m (62 ft)
- Population (2023): 2,493
  - Density: 414/km^{2} (1,070/sq mi)
- Time zone: UTC+01:00 (CET)
  - Summer (DST): UTC+02:00 (CEST)
- INSEE/Postal code: 62735 /62113
- ^{1} French Land Register data, which excludes lakes, ponds, glaciers > 1 km^{2} (0.386 sq mi or 247 acres) and river estuaries.

Sailly-Labourse (French pronunciation: [saji labuʁs]) is a commune in the Pas-de-Calais department in the Hauts-de-France region of France about 3 miles (4.8 km) southeast of Béthune and 24 miles (39 km) southwest of Lille.

== Population ==
Historical population
| Year | Pop. | ±% p.a. |
|---|---|---|
| 1968 | 1,957 | — |
| 1975 | 1,889 | −0.50% |
| 1982 | 1,750 | −1.09% |
| 1990 | 1,938 | +1.28% |
| 1999 | 2,013 | +0.42% |
| 2007 | 2,136 | +0.74% |
| 2012 | 2,151 | +0.14% |
| 2017 | 2,336 | +1.66% |
| 2023 | 2,493 | +1.09% |
Source: INSEE

== See also ==
- Communes of the Pas-de-Calais department
