= Canton of Douvrin =

Coordinates: 50°31′15″N 2°48′33″E

Douvrin
- Canton
- Location of Douvrin within the department
- Country: France
- Region: Hauts-de-France
- Department: Pas-de-Calais
- No. of communes: {{{nbcomm}}}
- Area: 84.90 km^{2} (32.78 sq mi)
- Population (2023): 42,370
  - Density: 499.1/km^{2} (1,293/sq mi)
- INSEE code: 6223

The Canton of Douvrin is one of the cantons of the arrondissement of Béthune, in the Pas-de-Calais department, in northern France. Its seat is the town Douvrin.

== Composition ==
At the French canton reorganisation which came into effect in March 2015, the canton was expanded from 5 to 14 communes:

- Annequin
- Auchy-les-Mines
- Billy-Berclau
- Cambrin
- Cuinchy
- Douvrin
- Festubert
- Givenchy-lès-la-Bassée
- Haisnes
- Lorgies
- Noyelles-lès-Vermelles
- Sailly-Labourse
- Vermelles
- Violaines
