= Hinges, Pas-de-Calais =

Hinges
- Commune
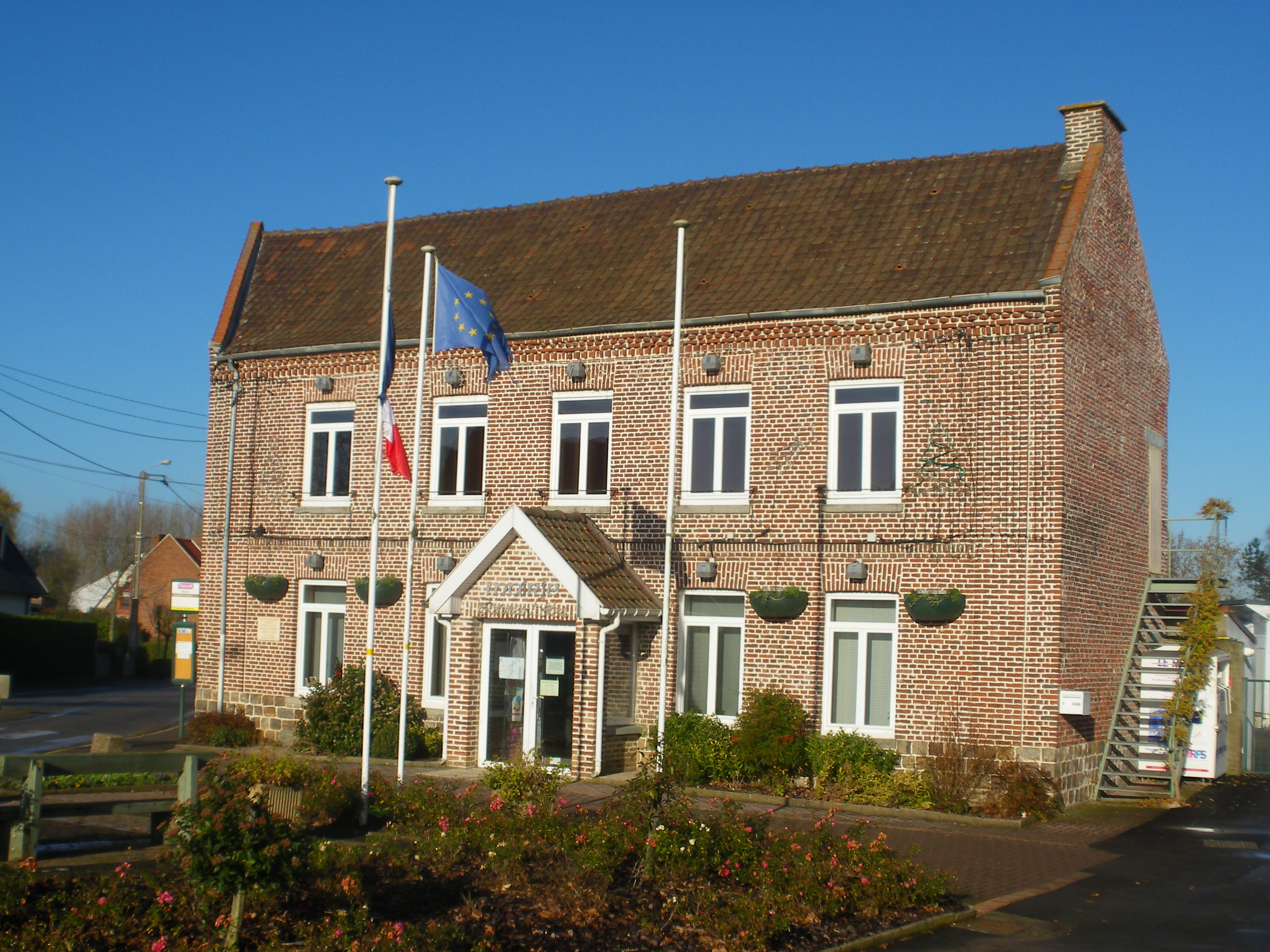
- The town hall of Hinges

- Coat of arms
- Location of Hinges
- Location within France Location within Hauts-de-France
- Coordinates: 50°33′57″N 2°37′23″E
- Country: France
- Region: Hauts-de-France
- Department: Pas-de-Calais
- Arrondissement: Béthune
- Canton: Beuvry
- Intercommunality: CA Béthune-Bruay, Artois-Lys Romane

Government
  - Mayor (2020–2026): Corinne Laversin
- Area^{1}: 8.31 km^{2} (3.21 sq mi)
- Elevation: 44 m (144 ft)
- Highest elevation: 47 m (154 ft)
- Lowest elevation: 16 m (52 ft)
- Population (2023): 2,485
  - Density: 299/km^{2} (775/sq mi)
- Time zone: UTC+01:00 (CET)
  - Summer (DST): UTC+02:00 (CEST)
- INSEE/Postal code: 62454 /62232
- ^{1} French Land Register data, which excludes lakes, ponds, glaciers > 1 km^{2} (0.386 sq mi or 247 acres) and river estuaries.

Hinges (French pronunciation: [ɛ̃ʒ]) is a commune in the Pas-de-Calais department in the Hauts-de-France region of France about 3 miles (4.8 km) north of Béthune. The Canal d’Aire flows around the north-eastern part of the commune.

== Population ==
Historical population
Year	Pop.	±% p.a.
1968	1,320	—
1975	1,365	+0.48%
1982	1,542	+1.76%
1990	1,856	+2.34%
1999	2,003	+0.85%
2007	2,173	+1.02%
2012	2,291	+1.06%
2017	2,452	+1.37%
2023	2,485	+0.22%
Source: INSEE

== See also ==
- Communes of the Pas-de-Calais department
