= Essars =

- Commune
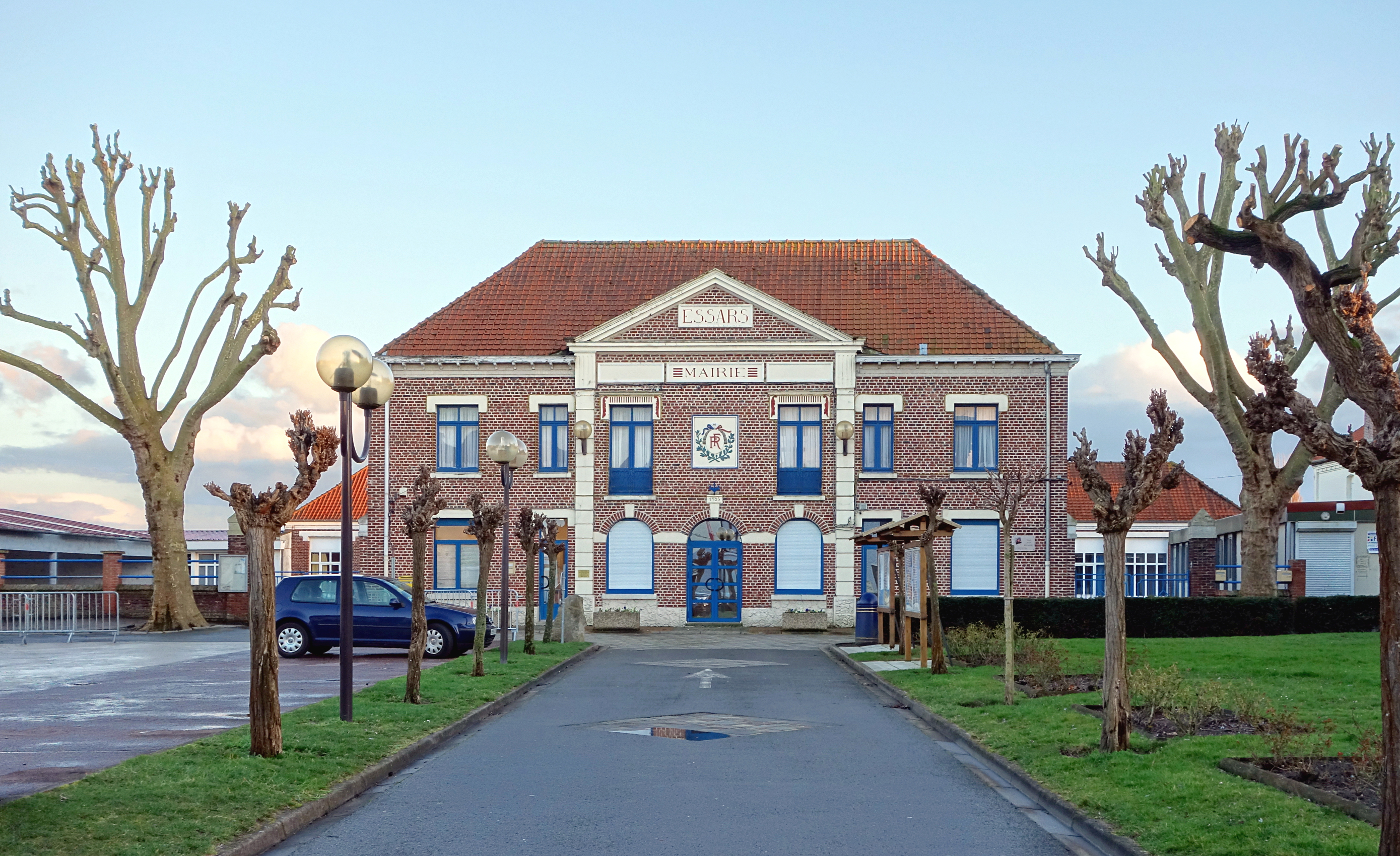
- The town hall of Essars

- Coat of arms
- Location of Essars
- Location within France Location within Hauts-de-France
- Coordinates: 50°32′52″N 2°39′55″E
- Country: France
- Region: Hauts-de-France
- Department: Pas-de-Calais
- Arrondissement: Béthune
- Canton: Beuvry
- Intercommunality: CA Béthune-Bruay, Artois-Lys Romane

Government
  - Mayor (2020–2026): Gérard Malbranque
- Area^{1}: 3.72 km^{2} (1.44 sq mi)
- Elevation: 21 m (69 ft)
- Highest elevation: 23 m (75 ft)
- Lowest elevation: 18 m (59 ft)
- Population (2023): 1,753
  - Density: 471/km^{2} (1,220/sq mi)
- Time zone: UTC+01:00 (CET)
  - Summer (DST): UTC+02:00 (CEST)
- INSEE/Postal code: 62310 /62400
- ^{1} French Land Register data, which excludes lakes, ponds, glaciers > 1 km^{2} (0.386 sq mi or 247 acres) and river estuaries.

Essars (French pronunciation: [esaʁ]) is a commune in the Pas-de-Calais department in the Hauts-de-France region of France northeast of Béthune and 20 miles (32 km) southwest of Lille.

== Population ==
Historical population
Year	Pop.	±% p.a.
1968	1,175	—
1975	1,151	−0.29%
1982	1,683	+5.58%
1990	1,919	+1.65%
1999	1,732	−1.13%
2007	1,645	−0.64%
2012	1,615	−0.37%
2017	1,725	+1.33%
2023	1,753	+0.27%
Source: INSEE

== See also ==
- Communes of the Pas-de-Calais department
