= Verquigneul =

- Commune
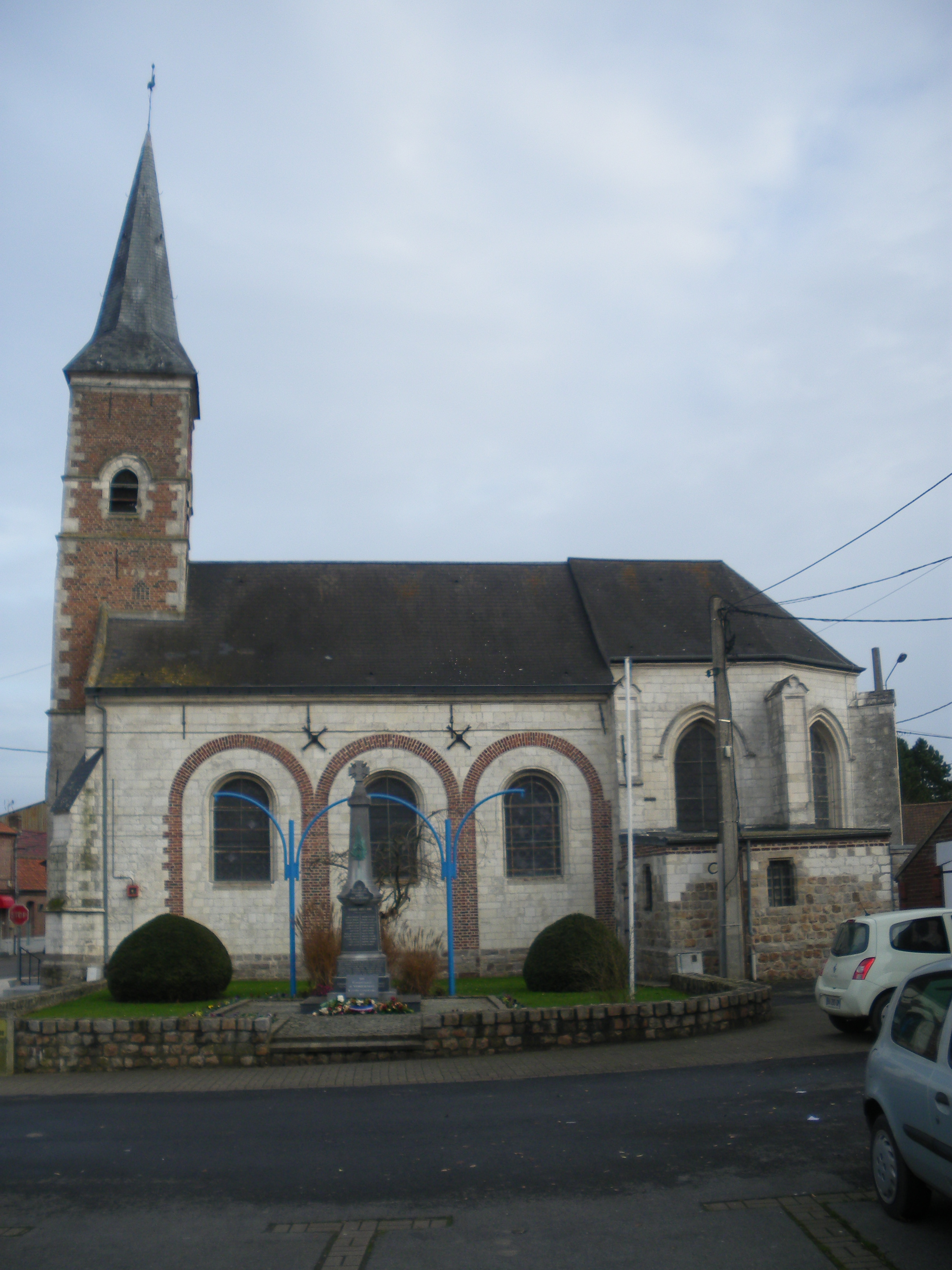
- The church of Verquigneul

- Flag Coat of arms
- Location of Verquigneul
- Location within France Location within Hauts-de-France
- Coordinates: 50°30′13″N 2°40′03″E
- Country: France
- Region: Hauts-de-France
- Department: Pas-de-Calais
- Arrondissement: Béthune
- Canton: Beuvry
- Intercommunality: CA Béthune-Bruay, Artois-Lys Romane

Government
  - Mayor (2020–2026): Bruno Chretien
- Area^{1}: 3.54 km^{2} (1.37 sq mi)
- Population (2023): 1,978
  - Density: 559/km^{2} (1,450/sq mi)
- Time zone: UTC+01:00 (CET)
  - Summer (DST): UTC+02:00 (CEST)
- INSEE/Postal code: 62847 /62113
- ^{1} French Land Register data, which excludes lakes, ponds, glaciers > 1 km^{2} (0.386 sq mi or 247 acres) and river estuaries.

Verquigneul (French pronunciation: [vɛʁkiɲœl]) is a commune in the Pas-de-Calais Departments of France in the Hauts-de-France region of France.

== Population ==
Historical population
Year	Pop.	±% p.a.
1968	1,229	—
1975	1,488	+2.77%
1982	1,420	−0.67%
1990	1,647	+1.87%
1999	1,837	+1.22%
2007	1,971	+0.88%
2012	1,986	+0.15%
2017	1,929	−0.58%
2023	1,978	+0.42%
Source: INSEE

== See also ==
- Communes of the Pas-de-Calais department
