= Douvrin =

Douvrin Doverin
- Commune
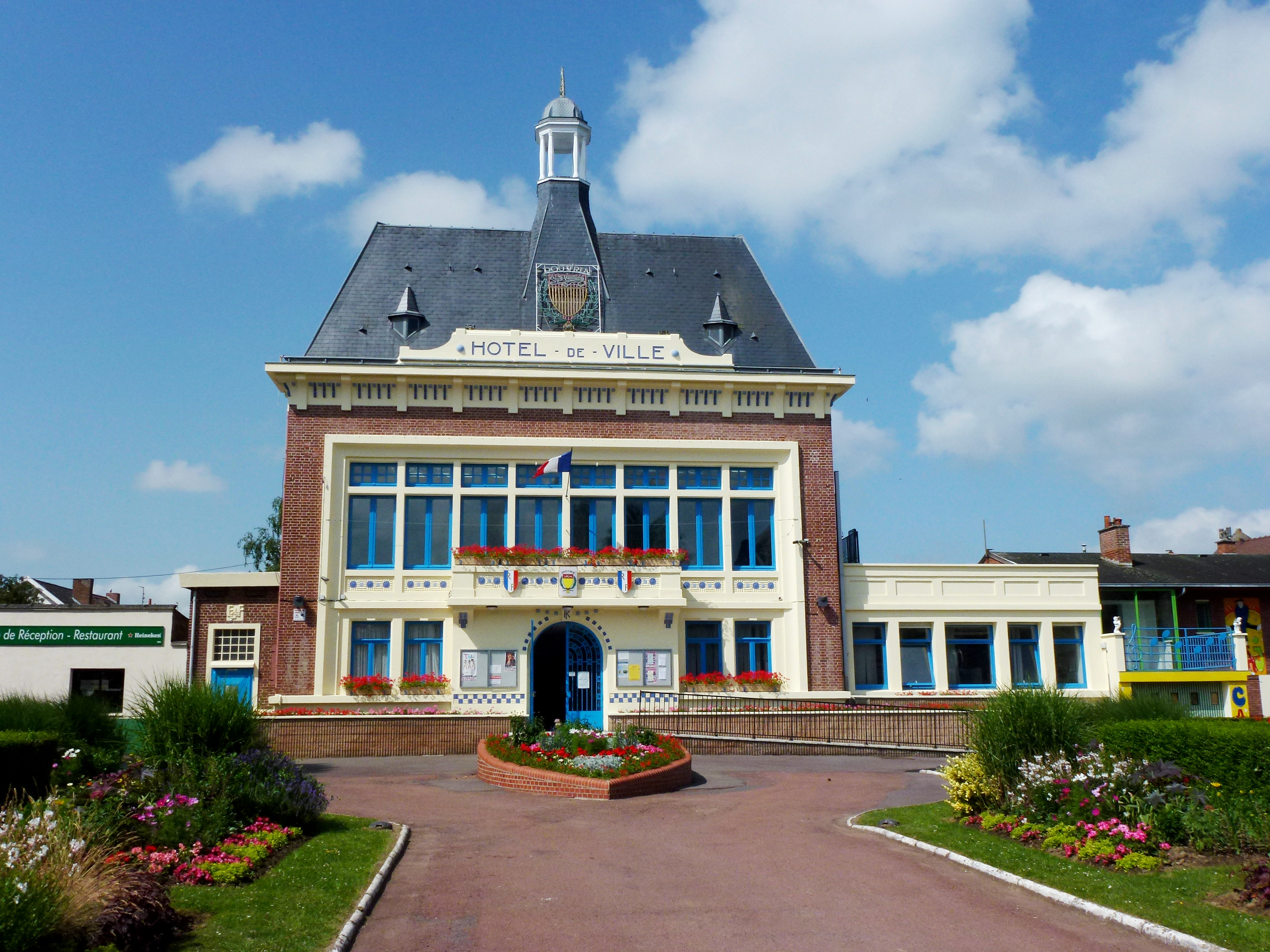
- The town hall of Douvrin

- Coat of arms
- Location of Douvrin
- Location within France Location within Hauts-de-France
- Coordinates: 50°30′38″N 2°49′56″E
- Country: France
- Region: Hauts-de-France
- Department: Pas-de-Calais
- Arrondissement: Béthune
- Canton: Douvrin
- Intercommunality: CA Béthune-Bruay, Artois-Lys Romane

Government
  - Mayor (2020–2026): Jean-Michel Dupont
- Area^{1}: 9.58 km^{2} (3.70 sq mi)
- Elevation: 25 m (82 ft)
- Highest elevation: 32 m (105 ft)
- Lowest elevation: 19 m (62 ft)
- Population (2023): 5,867
  - Density: 612/km^{2} (1,590/sq mi)
- Time zone: UTC+01:00 (CET)
  - Summer (DST): UTC+02:00 (CEST)
- INSEE/Postal code: 62276 /62138
- ^{1} French Land Register data, which excludes lakes, ponds, glaciers > 1 km^{2} (0.386 sq mi or 247 acres) and river estuaries.

Douvrin (French pronunciation: [duvʁɛ̃]; West Flemish: Doverin) is a commune in the Pas-de-Calais department in the Hauts-de-France region of France about 10 miles (16 km) east of Béthune and 15 miles (24 km) southwest of Lille.

== Population ==
Historical population
Year	Pop.	±% p.a.
1968	4,659	—
1975	4,736	+0.23%
1982	4,415	−1.00%
1990	5,442	+2.65%
1999	5,431	−0.02%
2007	5,111	−0.76%
2012	5,023	−0.35%
2017	5,407	+1.48%
2023	5,867	+1.37%
Source: INSEE

== See also ==
- Communes of the Pas-de-Calais department
