= Noyelles-lès-Vermelles =

- Commune
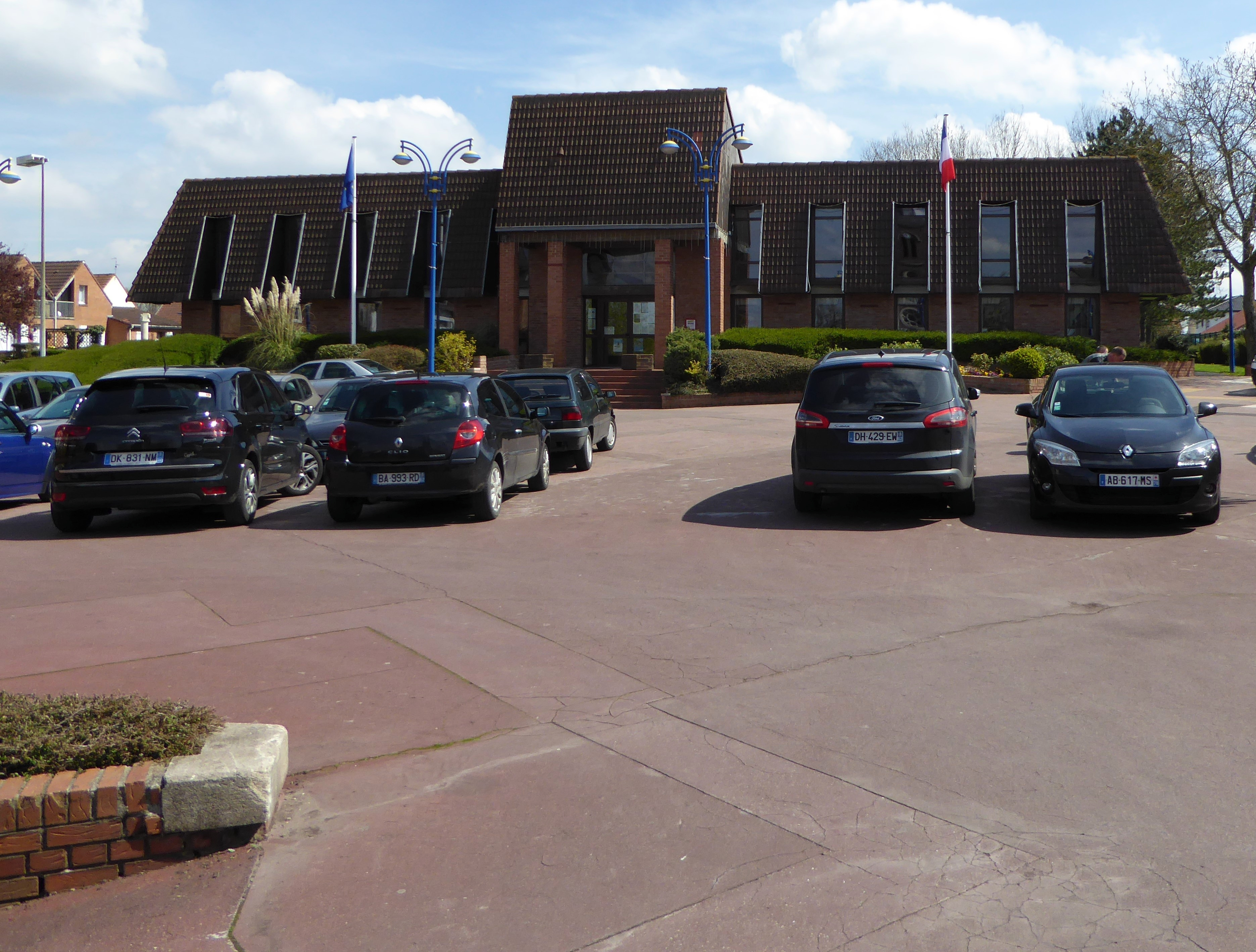
- The town hall of Noyelles-lès-Vermelles

- Coat of arms
- Location of Noyelles-lès-Vermelles
- Location within France Location within Hauts-de-France
- Coordinates: 50°29′24″N 2°43′36″E
- Country: France
- Region: Hauts-de-France
- Department: Pas-de-Calais
- Arrondissement: Béthune
- Canton: Douvrin
- Intercommunality: CA Béthune-Bruay, Artois-Lys Romane

Government
  - Mayor (2020–2026): Bruno Traché
- Area^{1}: 2.53 km^{2} (0.98 sq mi)
- Elevation: 32 m (105 ft)
- Highest elevation: 37 m (121 ft)
- Lowest elevation: 22 m (72 ft)
- Population (2023): 2,273
  - Density: 898/km^{2} (2,330/sq mi)
- Time zone: UTC+01:00 (CET)
  - Summer (DST): UTC+02:00 (CEST)
- INSEE/Postal code: 62626 /62980
- ^{1} French Land Register data, which excludes lakes, ponds, glaciers > 1 km^{2} (0.386 sq mi or 247 acres) and river estuaries.

Noyelles-lès-Vermelles (French pronunciation: [nwajɛl lɛ vɛʁmɛl], literally Noyelles near Vermelles) is a commune in the Pas-de-Calais department in the Hauts-de-France region of France.

== Geography ==
Noyelles-lès-Vermelles is situated about 5 miles (8.0 km) southeast of Béthune and 26 miles (42 km) southwest of Lille, at the junction of the D943 and D166 roads.

== Population ==
Historical population
Year	Pop.	±% p.a.
1968	1,158	—
1975	1,084	−0.94%
1982	1,415	+3.88%
1990	1,851	+3.41%
1999	1,939	+0.52%
2007	2,033	+0.59%
2012	2,315	+2.63%
2017	2,401	+0.73%
2023	2,273	−0.91%
Source: INSEE

== Places of interest ==
- The church of St. Vaast, dating from the nineteenth century.
- Traces of the motte of the château de Beaulieu.
- The war memorial.

== Twin towns ==
- Łomianki, Poland
- (Germany) Waldenburg, Allemagne (Saxe)

== See also ==
- Communes of the Pas-de-Calais department
