= Haisnes =

- Commune
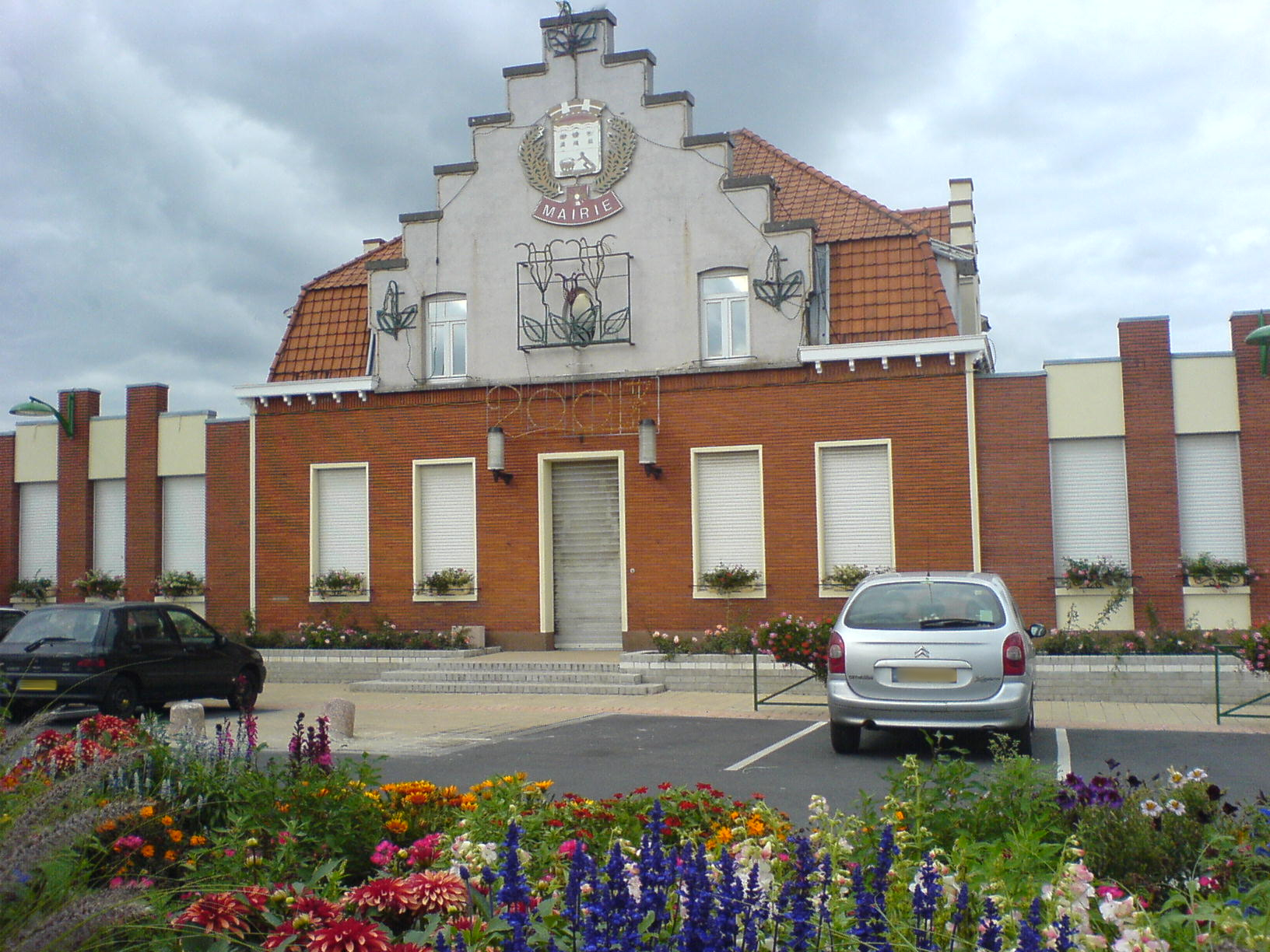
- Town hall

- Coat of arms
- Location of Haisnes
- Location within France Location within Hauts-de-France
- Coordinates: 50°30′31″N 2°48′09″E
- Country: France
- Region: Hauts-de-France
- Department: Pas-de-Calais
- Arrondissement: Béthune
- Canton: Douvrin
- Intercommunality: CA Béthune-Bruay, Artois-Lys Romane

Government
  - Mayor (2020–2026): Frédéric Wallet
- Area^{1}: 5.58 km^{2} (2.15 sq mi)
- Elevation: 26 m (85 ft)
- Highest elevation: 47 m (154 ft)
- Lowest elevation: 22 m (72 ft)
- Population (2023): 4,396
  - Density: 788/km^{2} (2,040/sq mi)
- Time zone: UTC+01:00 (CET)
  - Summer (DST): UTC+02:00 (CEST)
- INSEE/Postal code: 62401 /62138
- ^{1} French Land Register data, which excludes lakes, ponds, glaciers > 1 km^{2} (0.386 sq mi or 247 acres) and river estuaries.

Haisnes (French pronunciation: [ɛn]) is a commune in the Pas-de-Calais department in the Hauts-de-France region of France about 9 miles (14 km) east of Béthune and 16 miles (26 km) southwest of Lille.

== Population ==
Historical population
Year	Pop.	±% p.a.
1968	2,709	—
1975	3,106	+1.97%
1982	3,970	+3.57%
1990	4,525	+1.65%
1999	4,357	−0.42%
2007	4,271	−0.25%
2012	4,405	+0.62%
2017	4,337	−0.31%
2023	4,396	+0.23%
Source: INSEE

== See also ==
- Communes of the Pas-de-Calais department
