= Canton of Beuvry =

Coordinates: 50.52°N 2.68°E

The canton of Beuvry is an administrative division of the Pas-de-Calais department, in northern France. It was created at the French canton reorganisation which came into effect in March 2015. Its seat is in Beuvry.

It consists of the following communes:

1. Beuvry
2. La Couture
3. Essars
4. Fleurbaix
5. Hinges
6. Laventie
7. Locon
8. Neuve-Chapelle
9. Richebourg
10. Sailly-sur-la-Lys
11. Verquigneul
12. Verquin
13. Vieille-Chapelle
