= Verquin =

Verquin Werkin
- Commune
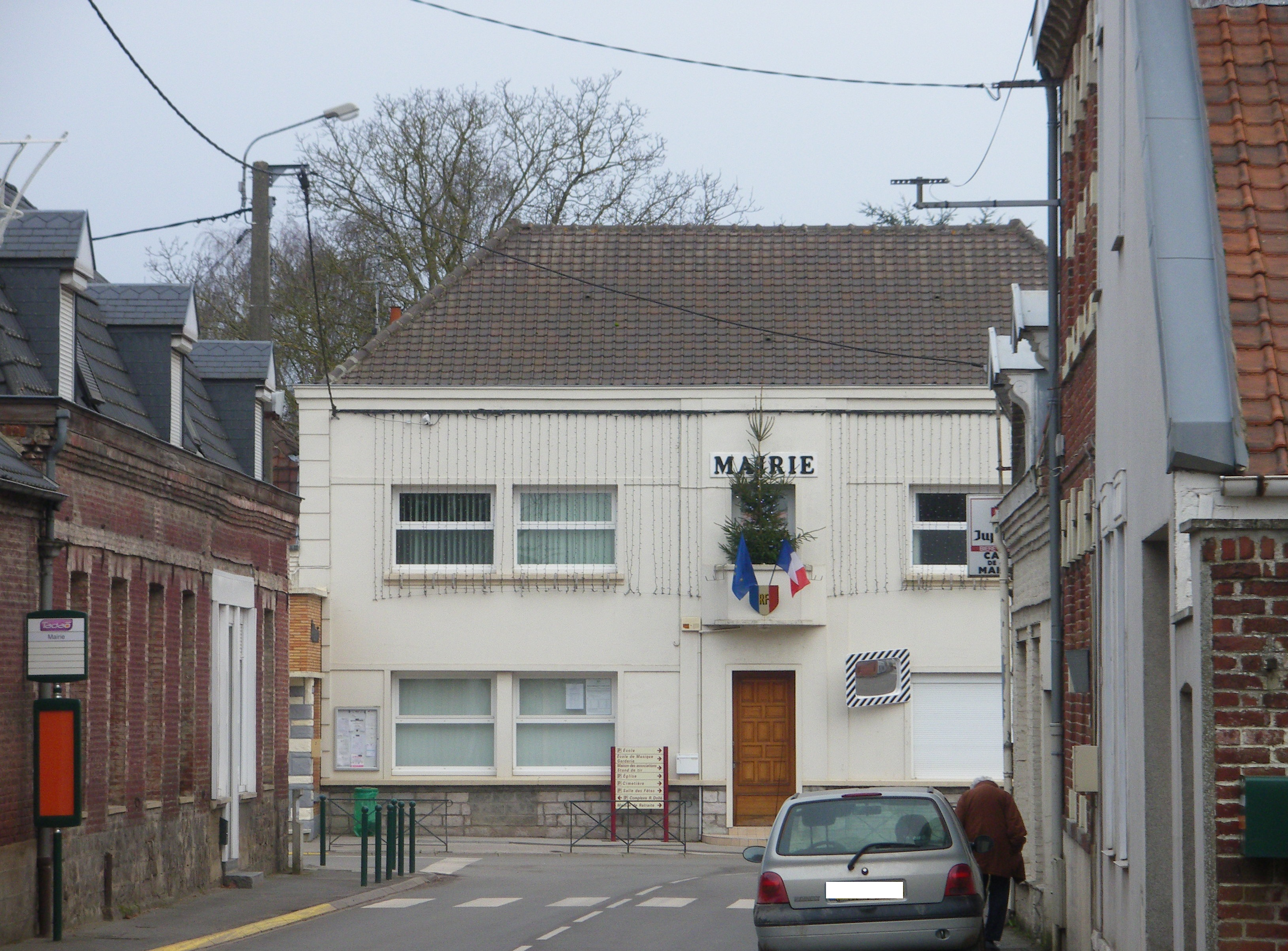
- The town hall of Verquin
- Location of Verquin
- Location within France Location within Hauts-de-France
- Coordinates: 50°30′11″N 2°38′27″E
- Country: France
- Region: Hauts-de-France
- Department: Pas-de-Calais
- Arrondissement: Béthune
- Canton: Beuvry
- Intercommunality: CA Béthune-Bruay, Artois-Lys Romane

Government
  - Mayor (2020–2026): Thierry Tassez
- Area^{1}: 3.7 km^{2} (1.4 sq mi)
- Elevation: 40 m (130 ft)
- Highest elevation: 52 m (171 ft)
- Lowest elevation: 25 m (82 ft)
- Population (2023): 3,445
  - Density: 930/km^{2} (2,400/sq mi)
- Time zone: UTC+01:00 (CET)
  - Summer (DST): UTC+02:00 (CEST)
- INSEE/Postal code: 62848 /62131
- ^{1} French Land Register data, which excludes lakes, ponds, glaciers > 1 km^{2} (0.386 sq mi or 247 acres) and river estuaries.

Verquin (French pronunciation: [vɛʁkɛ̃]; West Flemish: Werkin) is a commune in the Pas-de-Calais department in the Hauts-de-France region of France.

== Geography ==
An ex-coalmining town, Verquin is situated some 3 miles (4.8 km) south of Béthune centre and 24 miles (39 km) southwest of Lille, at the junction of the D941, D937 and D72 roads. The A26 autoroute passes through the middle of the commune.

== Population ==
Historical population
Year	Pop.	±% p.a.
1968	3,393	—
1975	3,242	−0.65%
1982	3,385	+0.62%
1990	3,453	+0.25%
1999	3,248	−0.68%
2007	3,241	−0.03%
2012	3,412	+1.03%
2017	3,452	+0.23%
2023	3,445	−0.03%
Source: INSEE

== Places of interest ==
- The church of St. Amé, dating from the sixteenth century.
- The war memorial.
- The Commonwealth War Graves Commission cemetery.

== See also ==
- Communes of the Pas-de-Calais department
