= La Couture, Pas-de-Calais =

La Couture De Kouter
- Commune
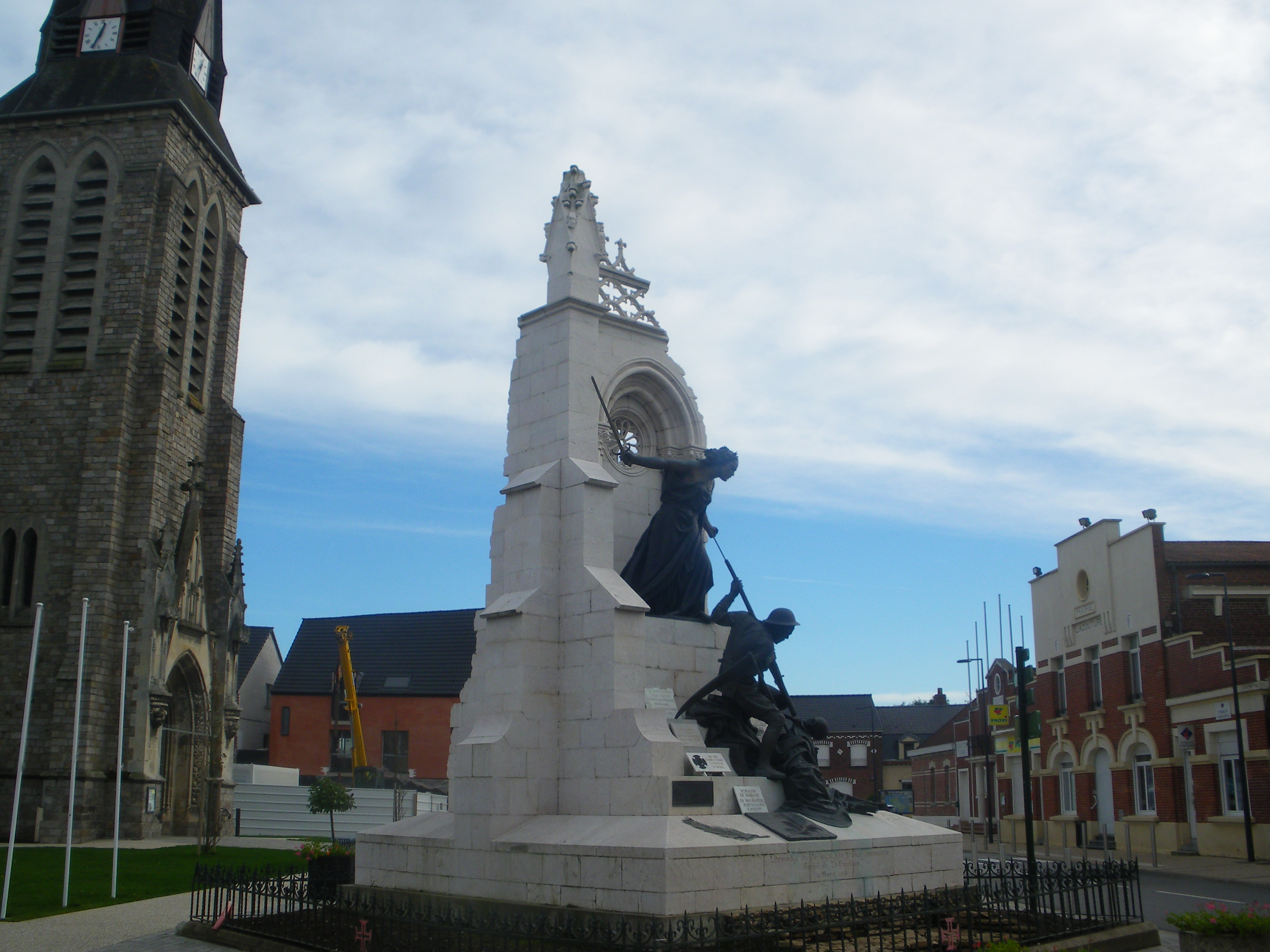
- The church, war memorial and town hall of La Couture

- Coat of arms
- Location of La Couture
- Location within France Location within Hauts-de-France
- Coordinates: 50°34′55″N 2°42′46″E
- Country: France
- Region: Hauts-de-France
- Department: Pas-de-Calais
- Arrondissement: Béthune
- Canton: Beuvry
- Intercommunality: CA Béthune-Bruay, Artois-Lys Romane

Government
  - Mayor (2020–2026): Raymond Gaquère
- Area^{1}: 13.52 km^{2} (5.22 sq mi)
- Elevation: 18 m (59 ft)
- Highest elevation: 20 m (66 ft)
- Lowest elevation: 15 m (49 ft)
- Population (2023): 2,590
  - Density: 192/km^{2} (496/sq mi)
- Time zone: UTC+01:00 (CET)
  - Summer (DST): UTC+02:00 (CEST)
- INSEE/Postal code: 62252 /62136
- ^{1} French Land Register data, which excludes lakes, ponds, glaciers > 1 km^{2} (0.386 sq mi or 247 acres) and river estuaries.

La Couture (French pronunciation: [la kutyʁ]; West Flemish: De Kouter) is a commune in the Pas-de-Calais department in the Hauts-de-France region of France about 6 miles (9.7 km) northeast of Béthune and 18 miles (29 km) west of Lille.

== Population ==
Historical population
Year	Pop.	±% p.a.
1968	1,327	—
1975	1,332	+0.05%
1982	1,666	+3.25%
1990	2,165	+3.33%
1999	2,249	+0.42%
2007	2,593	+1.80%
2012	2,712	+0.90%
2017	2,764	+0.38%
2023	2,590	−1.08%
Source: INSEE

== See also ==
- Communes of the Pas-de-Calais department
