= Lorgies =

- Commune
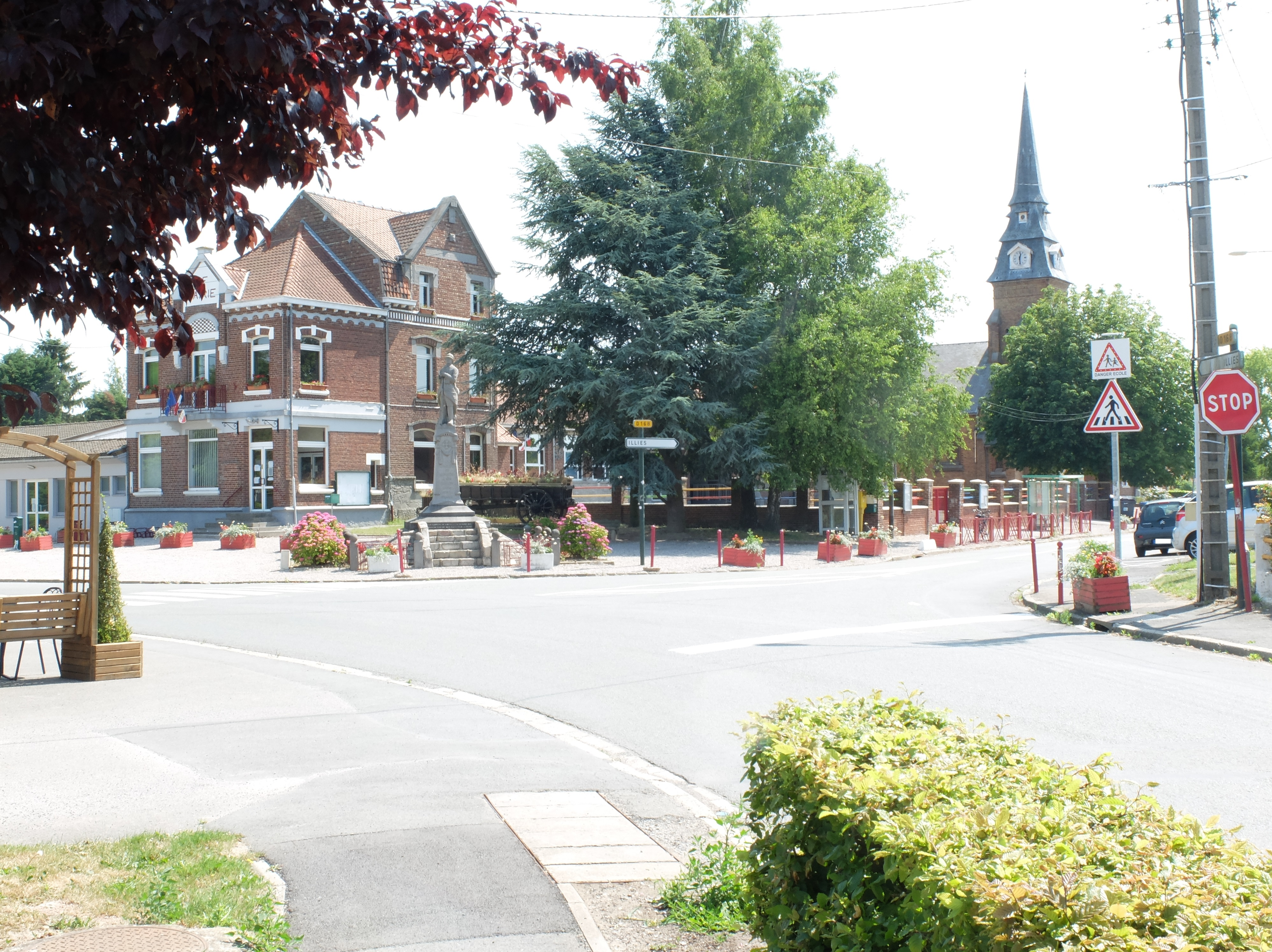
- The centre of Lorgies

- Coat of arms
- Location of Lorgies
- Location within France Location within Hauts-de-France
- Coordinates: 50°34′08″N 2°47′29″E
- Country: France
- Region: Hauts-de-France
- Department: Pas-de-Calais
- Arrondissement: Béthune
- Canton: Douvrin
- Intercommunality: CA Béthune-Bruay, Artois-Lys Romane

Government
  - Mayor (2023–2026): Laëtitia Mariini
- Area^{1}: 6.84 km^{2} (2.64 sq mi)
- Elevation: 21 m (69 ft)
- Highest elevation: 26 m (85 ft)
- Lowest elevation: 19 m (62 ft)
- Population (2023): 1,651
  - Density: 241/km^{2} (625/sq mi)
- Time zone: UTC+01:00 (CET)
  - Summer (DST): UTC+02:00 (CEST)
- INSEE/Postal code: 62529 /62840
- ^{1} French Land Register data, which excludes lakes, ponds, glaciers > 1 km^{2} (0.386 sq mi or 247 acres) and river estuaries.

Lorgies (French pronunciation: [lɔʁʒi]) is a commune in the Pas-de-Calais department in the Hauts-de-France region of France about 12 miles (19 km) northeast of Béthune and 13 miles (21 km) southwest of Lille.

== Population ==
Historical population
| Year | Pop. | ±% p.a. |
|---|---|---|
| 1968 | 858 | — |
| 1975 | 853 | −0.08% |
| 1982 | 922 | +1.12% |
| 1990 | 1,142 | +2.71% |
| 1999 | 1,174 | +0.31% |
| 2007 | 1,513 | +3.22% |
| 2012 | 1,578 | +0.84% |
| 2017 | 1,586 | +0.10% |
| 2023 | 1,651 | +0.67% |
Source: INSEE

== See also ==
- Communes of the Pas-de-Calais department
