= Violaines =

- Commune
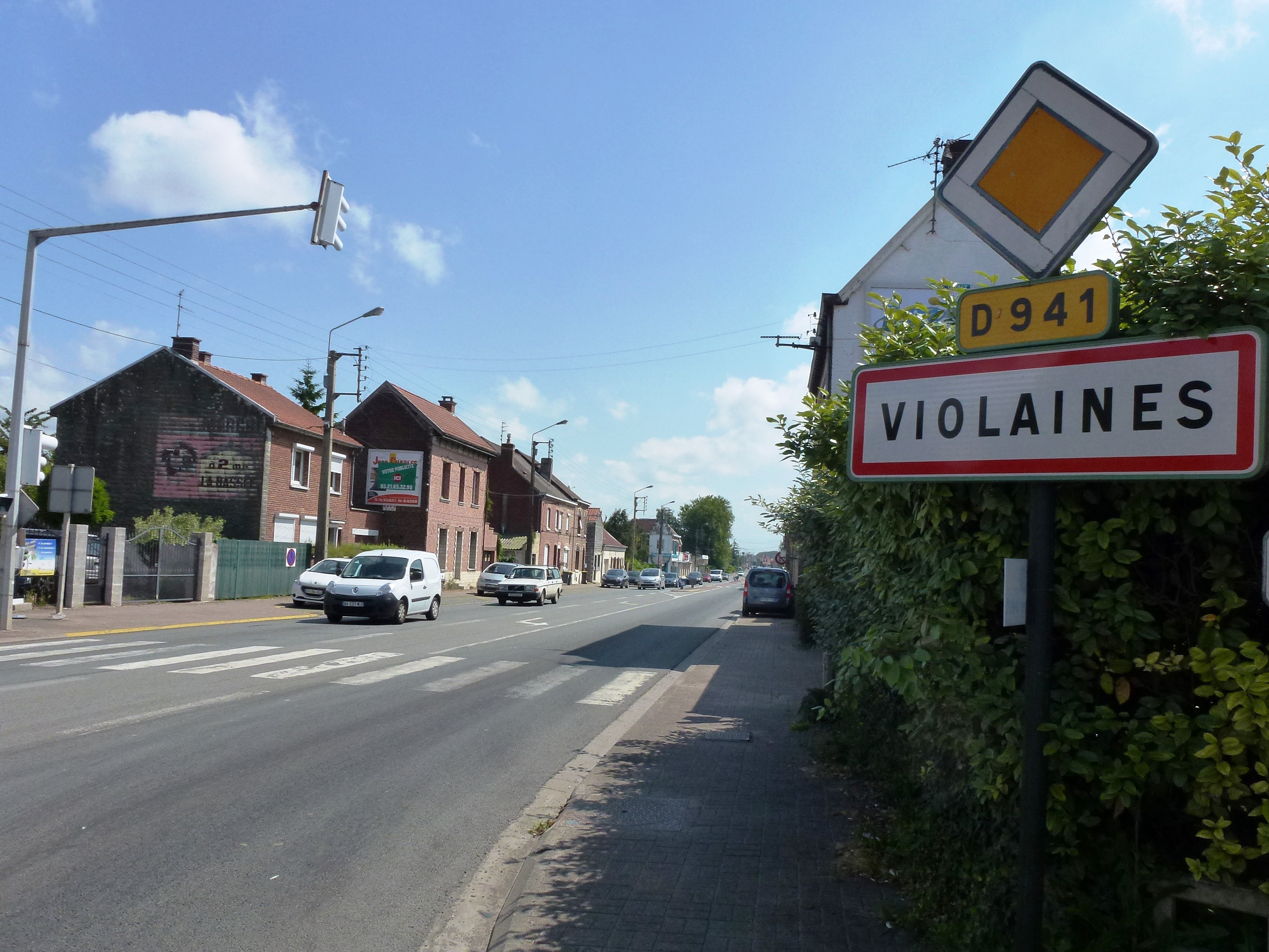
- The road into Violaines

- Coat of arms
- Location of Violaines
- Location within France Location within Hauts-de-France
- Coordinates: 50°32′28″N 2°47′23″E
- Country: France
- Region: Hauts-de-France
- Department: Pas-de-Calais
- Arrondissement: Béthune
- Canton: Douvrin
- Intercommunality: CA Béthune-Bruay, Artois-Lys Romane

Government
  - Mayor (2020–2026): Jean-François Castell
- Area^{1}: 10.01 km^{2} (3.86 sq mi)
- Elevation: 24 m (79 ft)
- Highest elevation: 34 m (112 ft)
- Lowest elevation: 19 m (62 ft)
- Population (2023): 3,839
  - Density: 383.5/km^{2} (993.3/sq mi)
- Demonym(s): Violainois, Violainoises
- Time zone: UTC+01:00 (CET)
  - Summer (DST): UTC+02:00 (CEST)
- INSEE/Postal code: 62863 /62138
- ^{1} French Land Register data, which excludes lakes, ponds, glaciers > 1 km^{2} (0.386 sq mi or 247 acres) and river estuaries.

Violaines (French pronunciation: [vjɔlɛn]) is a commune in the Pas-de-Calais department in the Hauts-de-France region of France.

== Geography ==
An ex-coalmining region, Violaines is situated some 7 miles (11 km) east of Béthune and 17 miles (27 km) southwest of Lille, at the junction of the D167 and D947 roads.

== Population ==
Historical population
Year	Pop.	±% p.a.
1968	1,984	—
1975	2,425	+2.91%
1982	2,890	+2.54%
1990	3,524	+2.51%
1999	3,577	+0.17%
2007	3,682	+0.36%
2012	3,671	−0.06%
2017	3,667	−0.02%
2023	3,839	+0.77%
Source: INSEE

== Places of interest ==
- The church of St.Vaast, rebuilt along with much of the village, after World War I.
- The war memorial.
- The Commonwealth War Graves Commission cemetery.

== International relations ==
Violaine is twinned with:

- Schwerte-Wandhofen in Germany

== See also ==
- Communes of the Pas-de-Calais department
