= Cuinchy =

- Commune
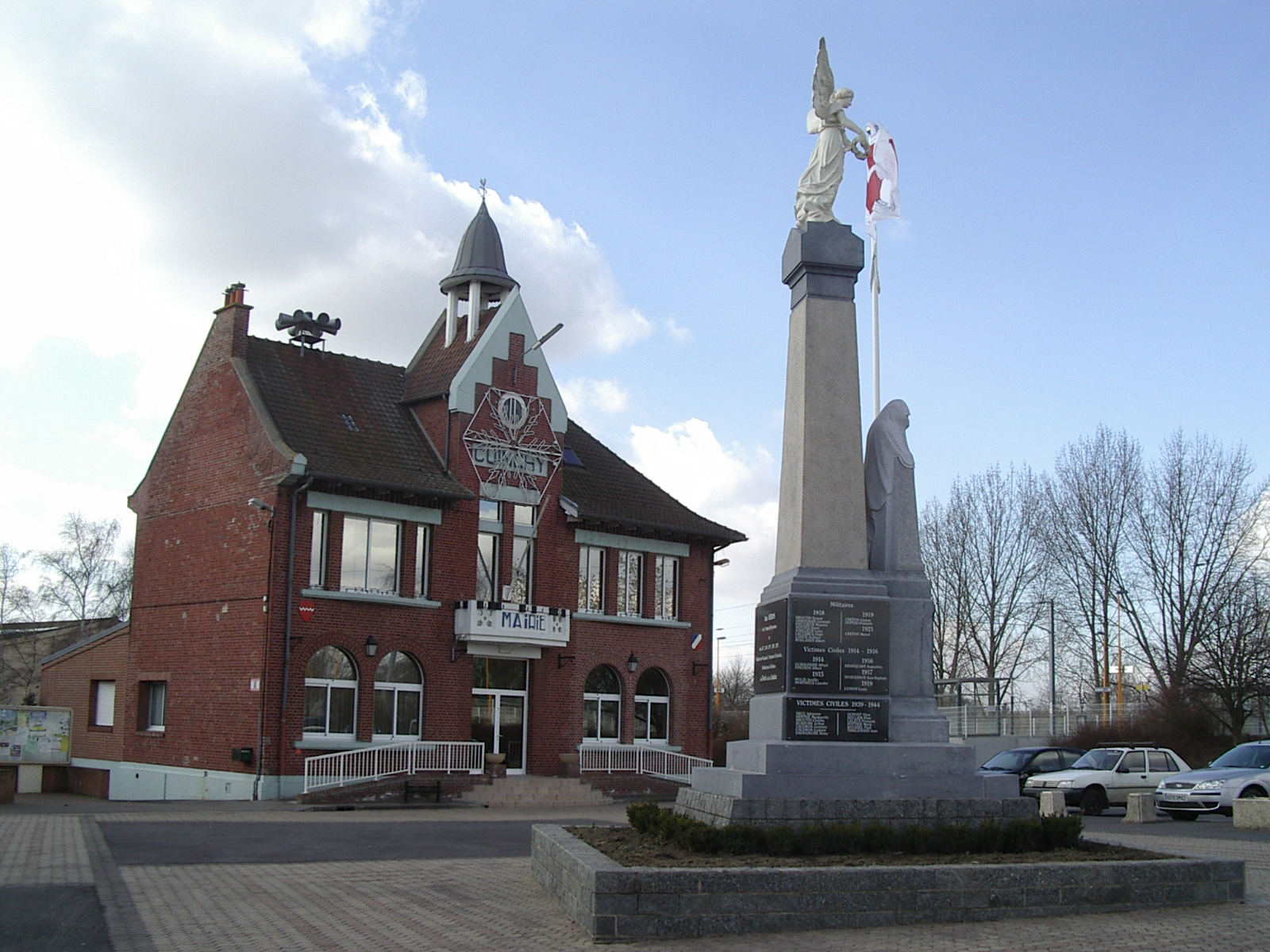
- The town hall of Cuinchy

- Coat of arms
- Location of Cuinchy
- Location within France Location within Hauts-de-France
- Coordinates: 50°31′12″N 2°44′58″E
- Country: France
- Region: Hauts-de-France
- Department: Pas-de-Calais
- Arrondissement: Béthune
- Canton: Douvrin
- Intercommunality: CA Béthune-Bruay, Artois-Lys Romane

Government
  - Mayor (2020–2026): Dominique Delecourt
- Area^{1}: 4.15 km^{2} (1.60 sq mi)
- Elevation: 21 m (69 ft)
- Highest elevation: 35 m (115 ft)
- Lowest elevation: 19 m (62 ft)
- Population (2023): 1,784
  - Density: 430/km^{2} (1,110/sq mi)
- Time zone: UTC+01:00 (CET)
  - Summer (DST): UTC+02:00 (CEST)
- INSEE/Postal code: 62262 /62149
- ^{1} French Land Register data, which excludes lakes, ponds, glaciers > 1 km^{2} (0.386 sq mi or 247 acres) and river estuaries.

Cuinchy (French pronunciation: [kɥɛ̃ʃi] or [kwɛ̃ʃi]) is a commune in the Pas-de-Calais department in the Hauts-de-France region of France about 5 miles (8.0 km) east of Béthune and 20 miles (32 km) southwest of Lille, by the banks of the Canal-d’Aire.

== History ==
The village was the source of the de Quincy family, who played a major part in the history of medieval England and Scotland.

== Population ==
Historical population
Year	Pop.	±% p.a.
1968	1,420	—
1975	1,538	+1.15%
1982	1,551	+0.12%
1990	1,646	+0.75%
1999	1,666	+0.13%
2007	1,767	+0.74%
2012	1,724	−0.49%
2017	1,741	+0.20%
2023	1,784	+0.41%
Source: INSEE

== See also ==
- Communes of the Pas-de-Calais department
