= Vieille-Chapelle =

Vieille-Chapelle Oedekapelle
- Commune
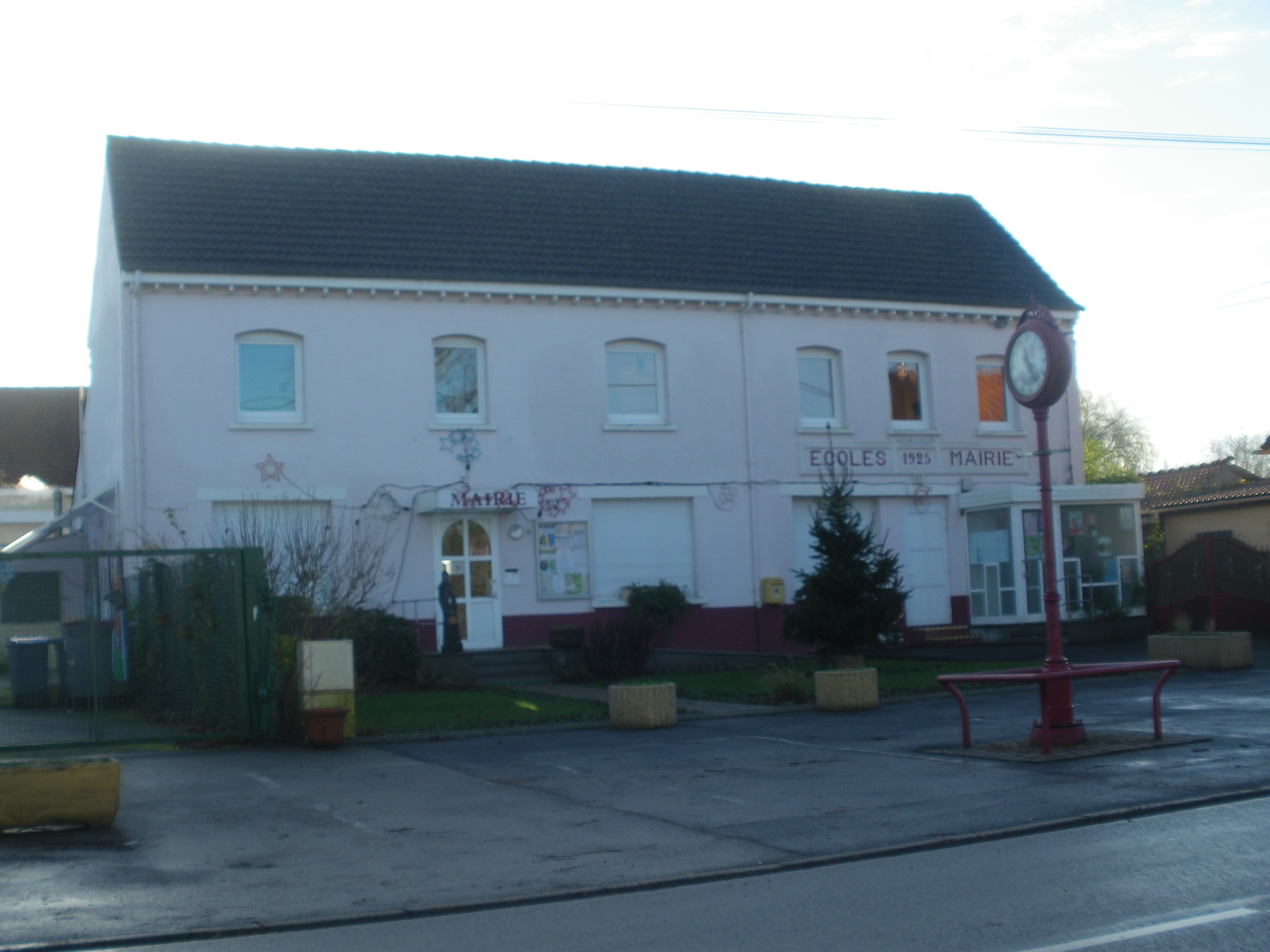
- The town hall of Vieille-Chapelle

- Coat of arms
- Location of Vieille-Chapelle
- Location within France Location within Hauts-de-France
- Coordinates: 50°35′32″N 2°42′23″E
- Country: France
- Region: Hauts-de-France
- Department: Pas-de-Calais
- Arrondissement: Béthune
- Canton: Beuvry
- Intercommunality: CA Béthune-Bruay, Artois-Lys Romane

Government
  - Mayor (2020–2026): Jean-Michel Desse
- Area^{1}: 3.41 km^{2} (1.32 sq mi)
- Elevation: 18 m (59 ft)
- Highest elevation: 19 m (62 ft)
- Lowest elevation: 16 m (52 ft)
- Population (2023): 882
  - Density: 259/km^{2} (670/sq mi)
- Time zone: UTC+01:00 (CET)
  - Summer (DST): UTC+02:00 (CEST)
- INSEE/Postal code: 62851 /62136
- ^{1} French Land Register data, which excludes lakes, ponds, glaciers > 1 km^{2} (0.386 sq mi or 247 acres) and river estuaries.

Vieille-Chapelle (French pronunciation: [vjɛj ʃapɛl]; West Flemish: Oedekapelle) is a commune in the Pas-de-Calais department in the Hauts-de-France region of France about 7 miles (11 km) northeast of Béthune and 15 miles (24 km) west of Lille. The river Lawe flows through the commune.

== Population ==
Historical population
Year	Pop.	±% p.a.
1968	323	—
1975	324	+0.04%
1982	466	+5.33%
1990	681	+4.86%
1999	697	+0.26%
2007	719	+0.39%
2012	793	+1.98%
2017	778	−0.38%
2023	882	+2.11%
Source: INSEE

== See also ==
- Communes of the Pas-de-Calais department
