= Sailly-sur-la-Lys =

Sailly-sur-la-Lys Zelleken
- Commune
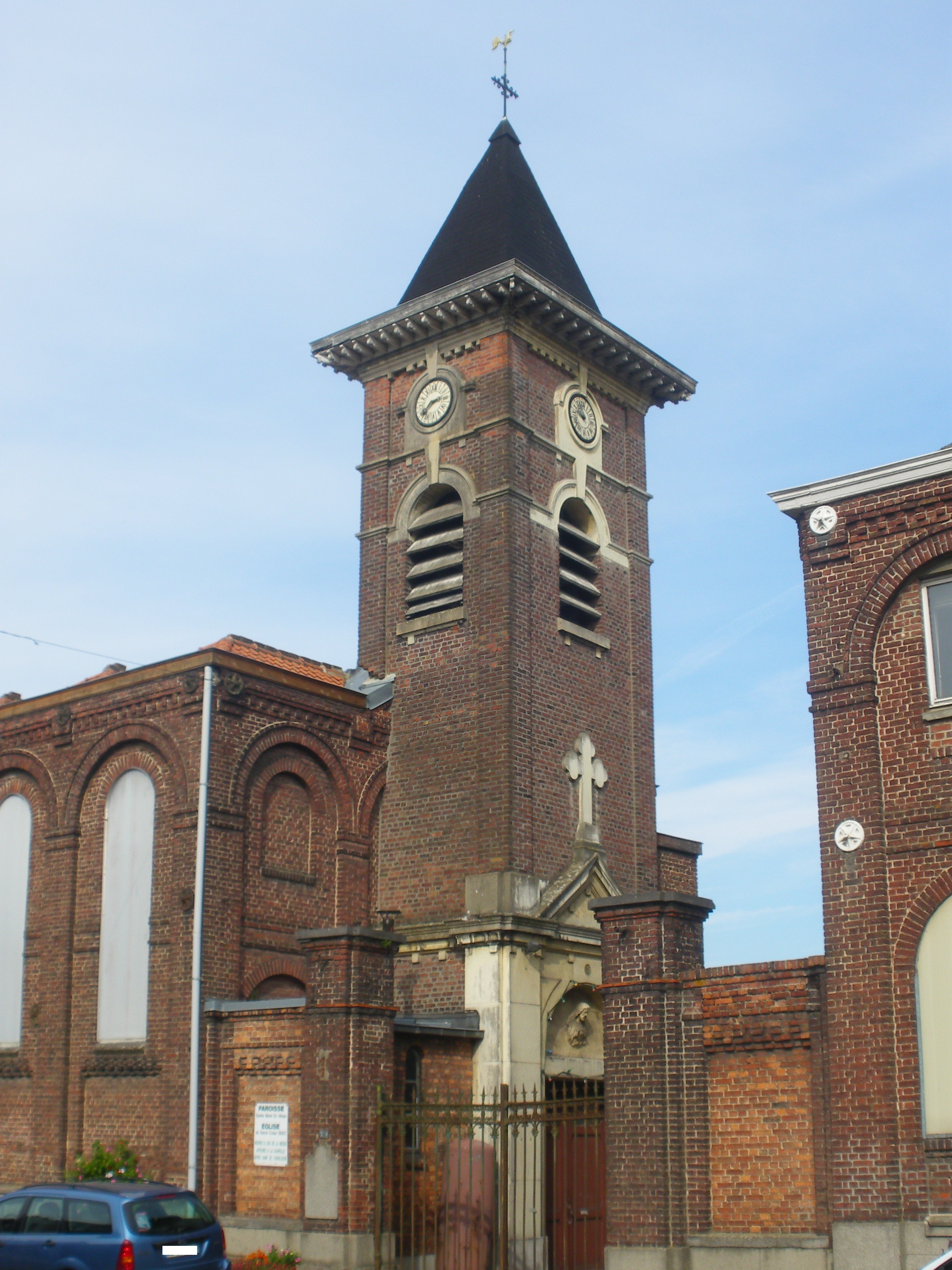
- The church of Sailly-sur-la-Lys

- Coat of arms
- Location of Sailly-sur-la-Lys
- Location within France Location within Hauts-de-France
- Coordinates: 50°39′30″N 2°46′15″E
- Country: France
- Region: Hauts-de-France
- Department: Pas-de-Calais
- Arrondissement: Béthune
- Canton: Beuvry
- Intercommunality: CC Flandre Lys

Government
  - Mayor (2020–2026): Jean-Claude Thorez
- Area^{1}: 9.7 km^{2} (3.7 sq mi)
- Elevation: 17 m (56 ft)
- Highest elevation: 19 m (62 ft)
- Lowest elevation: 13 m (43 ft)
- Population (2023): 3,981
  - Density: 410/km^{2} (1,100/sq mi)
- Time zone: UTC+01:00 (CET)
  - Summer (DST): UTC+02:00 (CEST)
- INSEE/Postal code: 62736 /62840
- ^{1} French Land Register data, which excludes lakes, ponds, glaciers > 1 km^{2} (0.386 sq mi or 247 acres) and river estuaries.

Sailly-sur-la-Lys (French pronunciation: [saji syʁ la lis], literally Sailly on the Lys; West Flemish: Zelleken) is a commune in the Pas-de-Calais department in the Hauts-de-France region of France.

== Geography ==
Sailly-sur-la-Lys is a large farming and light industrial village situated some 9 miles (14 km) northeast of Béthune and 12 miles (19 km) west northwest of Lille, at the junction of the D945 and D66 roads. The river Lys forms much of the western and northern boundary of the commune.

== Population ==
Historical population
Year	Pop.	±% p.a.
1968	1,924	—
1975	2,049	+0.90%
1982	2,919	+5.19%
1990	3,889	+3.65%
1999	3,981	+0.26%
2007	4,039	+0.18%
2012	4,037	−0.01%
2017	3,982	−0.27%
2023	3,981	−0.00%
Source: INSEE

== Places of interest ==
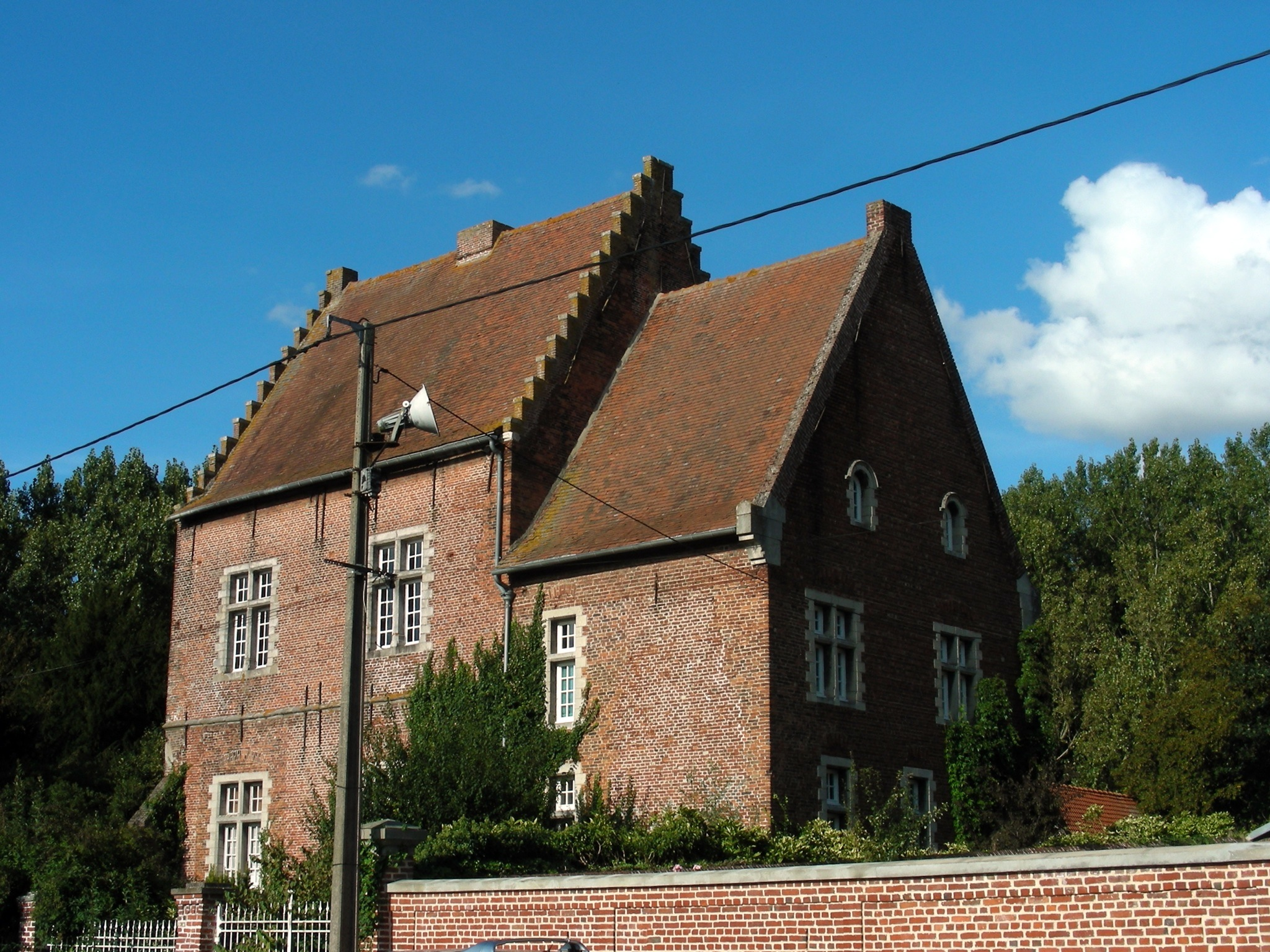
Prévôté of Sailly-sur-la-Lys

- The church of St. Vaast was rebuilt, along with most of the village, after the First World War.
- The Commonwealth War Graves Commission Canadian and Anzac cemeteries.
- The sixteenth century Prévôté; the oldest building in the town. English: provost’s house.

The prévôté is a fortified building located by the parish cemetery, near the Lys. It includes the remains of the prison and the courts of justice. A chapel dedicated to the Virgin complements the construction. The gateway, which was destroyed in the sixteenth century and rebuilt in 1612, is defended by two towers with mullioned windows. Before the French Revolution, it was the provost that represented the abbot of Saint-Vaast in all matters civil and judicial.

Sailly-sur-la-Lys is twinned with Carnforth, England.

== See also ==
- Communes of the Pas-de-Calais department
